= 2019–20 V.League Division 1 Men's squads =

Japanese volleyball

This article is the rosters of each Japanese 2019–20 V.League Division 1 Men's clubs.

== Suntory Sunbirds ==
The following is the roster of Suntory Sunbirds in 2019–20 season.

Head coach: (Japan) Masaji Ogino

No.	Player name	Date of birth	Position	Notes
1	(Japan) Taiki Tsuruda	July 13, 1991	Libero	
3	(Japan) Haruki Ono	October 27, 1995	Middle blocker	
4	(Japan) Atomu Torikai	April 6, 1996	Outside Hitter	Rookie
5	(Japan) Kentaro Matsubayashi	October 8, 1994	Outside Hitter	
6	(China) Ji Daoshuai	February 7, 1992	Outside Hitter	
7	(Japan) Yu Yamato	September 9, 1992	Setter	
9	(Japan) Masaki Oya	December 11, 1995	Setter	
10	(Japan) Kenya Fujinaka	July 25, 1993	Outside Hitter	
11	(Japan) Kosuke Hata	July 15, 1995	Outside Hitter	
12	(Japan) Tatsuya Shiota	November 17, 1989	Middle blocker	
13	(Russia) Dmitry Muserskiy	October 29, 1988	Middle blocker	
14	(Japan) Hisanori Kato	April 7, 1994	Middle Blocker	
15	(Japan) Yoshimitsu Kiire	May 13, 1995	Libero	
17	(Japan) Kentaro Hoshiya	November 8, 1991	Middle Blocker	Captain
18	(Japan) Takeshi Ogawa	July 7, 1994	Opposite Spiker	
19	(Japan) Masashi Kuriyama	July 14, 1988	Outside Hitter	
20	(Japan) Hiroki Nishida	August 15, 1997	Setter	Informal player
21	(Japan) Kenji Satoshi (ja)	January 16, 1997	Middle blocker	Rookie
22	(Japan) Yuito Takahashi	May 23, 1997	Libero	Informal player
23	(Japan) Tatsuki Kashiwada	November 9, 1997	Middle Blocker	Informal player

== Panasonic Panthers ==
The following is the roster of Panasonic Panthers in 2019–20 season.

Head coach: (Brazil) Mauricio Paes

No.	Player name	Date of birth	Position	Notes
1	(Japan) Kunihiro Shimizu	August 11, 1986	Opposite Spiker	
2	(Japan) Hideomi Fukatsu	June 1, 1990	Setter	Captain
4	(Japan) Issei Otake	December 3, 1995	Opposite Spiker	
5	(Japan) Sogo Watanabe	July 21, 1990	Outside Hitter	
6	(Japan) Kenji Shirasawa	May 21, 1984	Middle Blocker	
7	(Japan) Tsubasa Hisahara	March 18, 1995	Outside Hitter	
9	(Japan) Takahiko Imamura	May 20, 1993	Outside Hitter	
10	(Japan) Akihiro Yamauchi	November 30, 1993	Middle Blocker	
12	(Japan) Kazuya Senda	January 15, 1993	Outside Hitter	
13	(Poland) Michał Kubiak	February 23, 1988	Outside Hitter	
14	(Chinese Taipei) Hung-Min Liu	November 10, 1993	Outside Hitter	
16	(Japan) Ryohei Iga	June 29, 1994	Libero	
17	(Japan) Takeshi Nagano	July 11, 1985	Libero	
20	(Japan) Takahiro Shin	August 10, 1991	Setter	
21	(Japan) Yasunari Kodama	July 24, 1994	Middle Blocker	
22	(Japan) Yuichiro Komiya	November 16, 1992	Middle Blocker	

== Wolf Dogs Nagoya ==
The following is the roster of Wolf Dogs Nagoya in 2019–20 season.

Head coach: (Finland) Tommi Tiilikainen

No.	Player name	Date of birth	Position	Notes
1	(Japan) Shuzo Yamada	November 27, 1992	Outside hitter	
2	(Japan) Tetsu Yamachika	October 1, 1990	Middle Blocker	
4	(Japan) Shohei Uchiyama	November 1, 1987	Setter	
5	(Japan) Issei Maeda	September 22, 1991	Setter	
6	(Japan) Hirotaka Kon	March 9, 1988	Middle Blocker	
7	(Japan) Naoya Shiraiwa	February 15, 1990	Outside Hitter	
8	(Japan) Yuhi Kamiya	November 20, 1995	Middle Blocker	
9	(Japan) Takuya Takahashi	October 19, 1993	Middle Blocker	
10	(Japan) Koichiro Koga	August 30, 1984	Libero	Captain
11	(Japan) Ryota Denda	July 3, 1991	Middle Blocker	
12	(Japan) Takuya Takamatsu	January 8, 1988	Outside Hitter	
14	(Japan) Ryosuke Tsubakiyama	July 18, 1988	Opposite Spiker	
16	(Slovenia) Mitja Gasparini	June 26, 1984	Opposite Spiker	
21	(Japan) Motoki Eiro	June 8, 1996	Setter	
22	(Japan) Kenta Takanashi	March 25, 1997	Outside Hitter	Rookie
23	(Japan) Masato Katsuoka	July 3, 1996	Outside Hitter	
24	(Japan) Tomohiro Ogawa	July 4, 1996	Libero	
25	(Chinese Taipei) Hong-Jie Liu	November 10, 1993	Middle Blocker	

== JTEKT Stings ==
The following is the roster of JTEKT Stings in 2019–20 season.

Head coach: (Japan) Shinji Takahashi

No.	Player name	Date of birth	Position	Notes
1	(Japan) Yuto Fujinaka	April 20, 1996	Outside hitter	
2	(Japan) Akitomo Kanamaru	March 4, 1984	Middle blocker	
3	(Japan) Yamato Fushimi	December 24, 1991	Middle blocker	
4	(Japan) Taichi Fukuyama	December 20, 1993	Middle blocker	
5	(China) Rao Shuhan	December 23, 1996	Middle blocker New player	
6	(Bulgaria) Matey Kaziyski	September 23, 1984	Outside hitter	
7	(Japan) Kouhei Yanagisawa	May 24, 1993	Outside hitter	
8	(Japan) Hiroya Kori	February 6, 1996	Outside hitter	
9	(Japan) Masatoshi Tatsumi	January 9, 1989	Middle blocker	
10	(Japan) Mitsuki Kobayashi	May 10, 1997	Setter	
11	(Japan) Ryosuke Hakamaya	November 1, 1988	Opposite Spiker	
12	(Japan) Ryo Kohrogi	August 14, 1983	Libero	
14	(Japan) Yuji Nishida	January 30, 2000	Opposite Spiker	
15	(Japan) Souta Nakane	March 2, 1996	Setter	
16	(Japan) Sho Kuboyama	February 4, 1992	Setter	
17	(Japan) Ryuta Homma	October 17, 1991	Libero	Captain
18	(Japan) Junpei Michii	November 19, 1997	Setter	Informal player
19	(Japan) Hiroaki Asano	June 10, 1990	Outside hitter	

== Toray Arrows ==
The following is the roster of Toray Arrows in 2019–20 season.

Head coach: (Japan) Shinoda Ayumu

No.	Player name	Date of birth	Position	Notes
1	(Japan) Takaaki Tomimatsu	July 20, 1954	Middle Blocker	
2	(Japan) Kentaro Takahashi	February 8, 1995	Middle Blocker	
3	(Japan) Takumi Yamaguchi	August 30, 1997	Libero	Informal player
4	(France) Antonin Rouzier	August 18, 1986	Opposite Spiker	
5	(Japan) Yuta Yoneyama	August 29, 1984	Outside Hitter	
6	(Japan) Kazuki Ochiai	November 16, 1993	Opposite Spiker	
7	(Japan) Yudai Minemura	May 19, 1994	Outside Hitter	
8	(Japan) Tatsuya Setoguchi	May 25, 1988	Outside Hitter	
9	(Japan) Shoma Tomita	June 20, 1997	Outside Hitter	Informal player
10	(Japan) Hidetomo Hoshino	September 29, 1990	Outside Hitter	Captain
11	(Japan) Takahiro Tozaki	June 14, 1995	Outside Hitter	
14	(Japan) Keisuke Sakai	August 25, 1996	Setter	
15	(Japan) Haku Ri	December 27, 1990	Middle Blocker	
17	(Japan) Hiroki Ozawa	September 21, 1997	Outside Hitter	Informal player
18	(Japan) Yuji Suzuki	June 7, 1986	Middle Blocker	
19	(Japan) Satoshi Umeno	November 7, 1989	Setter	
20	(Myanmar) Aung Thu	July 10, 1993	Outside Hitter	
21	(Japan) Naonobu Fujii	January 5, 1992	Setter	
22	(Japan) Satoshi Ide	January 16, 1992	Libero	

== JT Thunders ==
The following is the roster of JT Thunders in 2019–20 season.

Head coach: (Slovenia) Tine Sattler

No.	Player name	Date of birth	Position	Notes
1	(Japan) Takuya Yasunaga	March 27, 1990	Middle Blocker	
2	(Japan) Taishi Onodera	February 27, 1996	Middle Blocker	
3	(Japan) Akihiro Fukatsu	July 23, 1987	Setter	
4	(Japan) Kenta Nakajima	August 25, 1991	Middle Blocker	
5	(Japan) Shunichiro Inoue	December 21, 1994	Outside Hitter	
6	(Australia) Thomas Edgar	June 21, 1989	Middle Blocker	
7	(Japan) Daisuke Yako	October 7, 1988	Outside Hitter	
8	(Japan) Koshi Takechi	January 1, 1996	Outside Hitter	
9	(Japan) Kodai Yoshioka	March 14, 1992	Outside Hitter	
10	(Japan) Wataru Inoue	July 5, 1994	Libero	
11	(Japan) Daiki Hisahara	December 26, 1991	Outside Hitter	
12	(Japan) Shinpei Goda	September 23, 1992	Setter	
14	(Japan) Ataru Kumakura	December 17, 1995	Outside Hitter	
15	(Japan) Taishi Karakawa	August 12, 1992	Libero	
17	(Japan) Masaki Kaneko	October 23, 1997	Setter	
18	(Japan) Shohei Yamamoto	March 21, 1991	Outside Hitter	Captain
19	(Chinese Taipei) Chien-Chen Chen	November 20, 1989	Outside Hitter	
20	(Japan) Syogo Toimoto	June 25, 1987	Middle Blocker	
21	(Japan) Kai Rogers	July 2, 1994	Middle Blocker	

== Osaka Blazers Sakai ==
The following is the roster of Osaka Blazers Sakai in 2019–20 season.

Head coach: (United States) Gordon Mayforth

No.	Player name	Date of birth	Position	Notes
1	(Japan) Yoshihiko Matsumoto	January 7, 1981	Middle Blocker	
2	(Japan) Yuki Higuchi	April 27, 1996	Outside Hitter	
3	(Japan) Takato Miyahara	July 15, 1995	Opposite Spiker	
4	(Japan) Naoya Takano	April 30, 1993	Outside Hitter	Captain
5	(Japan) Tomohiro Horie	June 23, 1997	Libero	Informal player
6	(Japan) Takaya Yamazaki	April 11, 1995	Middle Blocker	
7	(Japan) Takashi Dekita	August 13, 1991	Middle Blocker	
8	(Japan) Sho Sagawa	February 11, 1991	Setter	
9	(Puerto Rico) Maurice Torres	July 6, 1991	Opposite Spiker	
10	(Japan) Shunsuke Chijiki	September 6, 1989	Outside Hitter	
11	(Japan) Masahiro Sekita	November 20, 1993	Setter	
12	(Japan) Yuki Koike	April 4, 1995	Outside Hitter	
14	(Japan) Shohei Yamaguchi	July 21, 1994	Setter	
16	(Japan) Ryosuke Imadomi	October 22, 1993	Libero	
20	(Japan) Tomohiro Yamamoto	November 5, 1994	Libero	
21	(Japan) Yutaro Takemoto	February 21, 1995	Middle Blocker	
23	(Japan) Yukika Uno	June 28, 996	Outside Hitter	

== FC Tokyo ==
The following is the roster of FC Tokyo in 2019–20 season.

Head coach: (Japan) Koichiro Shimbo

No.	Player name	Date of birth	Position	Notes
1	(Japan) Hiroshi Sakoda	May 1, 1996	Outside Hitter	Rookie
2	(Japan) Kentaro Tamaya	January 30, 1992	Setter	
3	(Japan) Yuya Tachibana	March 1, 1989	Libero	
4	(Japan) Yohei Yamada	October 9, 1988	Setter	
5	(Japan) Jin Inoue	April 2, 1992	Middle Blocker	
6	(Japan) Yoshiki Ohmi	April 16, 1997	Outside Hitter	
8	(Japan) Hideyuki Kuriyama	July 15, 1993	Middle Blocker	
9	(Japan) Dai Tezuka	November 18, 1988	Outside Hitter	
10	(Japan) Kenta Suzuki (ja)	September 13, 1982	Outside Hitter	
12	(Japan) Hirotaka Odashima	July 22, 1991	Middle Blocker	
13	(Japan) Hayata Yanagimachi	June 17, 1996	Opposite Spiker	
14	(Japan) Yuma Nagamoto	December 22, 1991	Opposite Spiker	Captain (Note: Later, withdrew due to the injury.)
15	(Japan) Wataru Taniguchi	November 5, 1996	Outside Hitter	
16	(Japan) Shin Tehara	April 14, 1993	Setter	Deputy captain
17	(Japan) Naoto Tomita	May 10, 1994	Outside Hitter	Withdrew, due to the injury
18	(Japan) Tetsuya Muto	November 5, 1997	Middle Blocker	Informal player
19	(Japan) Nazomi Sato	September 14, 1994	Opposite Spiker	
20	(Serbia) Petar Premović	September 12, 1994	Opposite Spiker	
21	(Japan) Ryosuke Hirata	May 18, 1995	Middle Blocker	
22	(Japan) Kazuki Miyahara	June 28, 1995	Outside Hitter	
23	(Japan) Ikumi Komori	October 3, 1995	Outside Hitter	
24	(Japan) Shohei Nose	July 20, 1993	Libero	Withdrew, due to the injury
26	(Japan) Ayato Kuroda	January 30, 1996	Outside Hitter	
—	(Japan) Koga Matsuda	December 31, 1997	Middle Blocker	Informal player

== VC Nagano Tridents ==
The following is the roster of VC Nagano Tridents in 2019–20 season.

Head coach: (Iran) Ahmad Masajedi

No.	Player name	Date of birth	Position	Notes
1	(Poland) Patryk Strzeżek	November 19, 1989	Opposite Spiker	
2	(Japan) Yusuke Sugai	September 10, 1997	Opposite Spiker	Rookie
3	(Japan) Yusaku Tagami	May 4, 1994	Middle Blocker	
4	(Japan) Ryusuke Nakamura	December 26, 1997	Outside Hitter	Informal player
5	(Japan) Shingo Kasari	January 29, 1997	Outside Hitter	Rookie
6	(Japan) Tatsuki Ito	January 2, 1998	Outside Hitter	Informal player
7	(Japan) Yu Kuriki	July 29, 1992	Outside Hitter	
8	(Japan) Yudai Kawahigashi	February 7, 1998	Setter	Informal player
9	(Japan) Kota Ikeda	February 8, 1997	Outside Hitter	Rookie
10	(Japan) Takaki Sugiyama	August 5, 1990	Libero	
12	(Japan) Kengo Yamamoto	June 22, 1992	Libero	
13	(Japan) Meguru Tsubaki	February 2, 1995	Setter	
14	(Japan) Ryoma Yanuki	December 24, 1995	Middle Blocker	
15	(Japan) Taihei Hazama	April 8, 1997	Middle Blocker	Informal player
16	(Japan) Kenshi Morisaki	July 25, 1992	Middle Blocker	
17	(Japan) Ayato Matsumura	April 29, 1998	Outside Hitter	
18	(Japan) Kentaro Osawa	August 28, 1995	Libero	
21	(Japan) Kazuki Takasawa	July 6, 1995	Outside Hitter	
22	(Japan) Masaya Kado	April 2, 1997	Libero	Informal player
24	(Japan) Tsubasa Osada	April 30, 1993	Setter	Captain

== Oita Miyoshi Weisse Adler ==
The following is the roster of Oita Miyoshi Weisse Adler in 2019–20 season.

Head coach: (Japan) Takashi Ogawa

No.	Player name	Date of birth	Position	Notes
1	(Philippines) Bryan Bagunas	October 10, 1997	Outside Hitter	
2	(Japan) Shintaro Tajiri	June 22, 1992	Setter	
3	(Japan) Ryota Abe	April 3, 1989	Outside Hitter	
4	(Japan) Masaya Katsu	July 12, 1994	Outside Hitter	Deputy Captain
5	(Japan) Motoyuki Onishi	March 29, 1996	Middle Blocker	
6	(Japan) Yoshinori Kimoto	October 24, 1996	Middle Blocker	
7	(Japan) Keisuke Natsuo	July 28, 1996	Libero	
8	(Japan) Kyogo Kawaguchi	March 22, 1997	Middle Blocker	
9	(Japan) Kazutoshi Hayashi	February 4, 1995	Middle Blocker	
10	(Japan) Kota Yamada	November 25, 1997	Outside Hitter	Informal player
12	(Japan) Katsuya Ishibashi	October 10, 1992	Outside Hitter	
13	(Japan) Masato Kubota	August 7, 1992	Libero	
14	(Rwanda) Yakan Guma	December 11, 1985	Opposite Spiker	
15	(Rwanda) Yves Mutabazi	November 26, 1994	Opposite Spiker	Withdrew due to the injury, replaced by (Rwanda) Yakan Guma (Note: Yves Mutabazi played the last match on November 2, 2019 and Yakan Guma played his first match on November 23, 2019.)
16	(Japan) Yutaka Hamamoto	July 6, 1993	Outside Hitter	
17	(Japan) Seishiro Shimasaki	November 7, 1990	Outside Hitter	
18	(Japan) Kenta Koga	September 17, 1997	Outside Hitter	Informal player
19	(Japan) Higushi Taichi	May 16, 1991	Outside Hitter	
21	(Japan) Naoki Inokuchi	April 27, 1997	Setter	Informal player
22	(Japan) Kurama Fujioka	October 4, 1993	Setter	
23	(Japan) Hiroki Fujita	March 11, 1994	Middle Blocker	Withdrew, due to the injury
24	(Japan) Kouki Komeda	December 14, 1993	Outside Hitter	Captain
