= 2023 Asian Men's Volleyball Championship squads =

This article shows the roster of all participating teams at the 2023 Asian Men's Volleyball Championship.

== Pool A ==
=== Iran ===
The following is Iran's roster in the 2023 Men's Championship.

Head coach: Behrouz Ataei

- 2 Milad Ebadipour OH
- 5 Mohammad Fallah Zarchoub MB
- 6 Mohammad Mousavi MB
- 8 Mohammad Reza Hazratpour L
- 10 Amin Esmaeilnezhad OP
- 11 Saber Kazemi OP
- 14 Javad Karimi S
- 17 Meisam Salehi OH
- 18 Mohammad Taher Vadi S
- 19 Poriya Hossein Khanzadeh Firouzjah OH
- 20 Shahrooz Homayonfarmanesh OH
- 21 Arman Salehi L
- 27 Mohammad Valizadeh MB
- 30 Mobin Nasri Mastanabad OH

=== Hong Kong ===
The following is Hong Kong's roster in the 2023 Men's Championship.

Head coach: (Serbia) Dragan Mihailović

- 1 Wing Chun Wong MB
- 2 Sze Lok Lam MB
- 3 Curtis Yuheng Chiu L
- 4 Ho Yin Leung OH
- 5 Ka Nam Wang OH
- 7 Chun Hin So OP
- 9 Pak Fai Chow L
- 10 Sze Wai Yuen S
- 11 Cheong Hung Siu OH
- 18 Chun Ho Damian Tam OP
- 19 Ka Yiu Sio MB
- 20 Ngai Yiu Cheung OH
- 26 Nga Tsun Pang MB
- 35 Cheuk Hang Kwan S

=== Iraq ===
The following is Iraq's roster in the 2023 Men's Championship.

Head coach: Khaleed Salih

- 1 Hussein Nameer Shamil Kamoona OP
- 2 Kareem Hadi Salih L
- 3 Saif Hussein Mohammed S
- 4 Muntadher Yasir MB
- 6 Mustafa Hameed Jabbar S
- 7 Nawzad Mohammed OP
- 8 Ali Taha Gharfour S
- 9 Maher Adnan Abdulwahhab MB
- 10 Aseel Jameel Nasser OP
- 11 Islam Sachit Challab Matrawi MB
- 12 Abbas Abdulkarem Abdulhussein L
- 14 Omar Ali Ahmed OP
- 18 Fahad Mundher L
- 19 Osamah Sabbar OH

== Pool B ==
=== Japan ===
The following is Japan's roster in the 2023 Men's Championship.

Head coach: (France) Philippe Blain

- 1 Yuji Nishida OP
- 2 Taishi Onodera MB
- 4 Kento Miyaura OP
- 5 Tatsunori Otsuka OH
- 6 Akihiro Yamauchi MB
- 8 Masahiro Sekita S
- 10 Kentaro Takahashi MB
- 12 Ran Takahashi OH
- 13 Tomohiro Ogawa L
- 14 Yūki Ishikawa OH
- 20 Tomohiro Yamamoto L
- 28 Larry Evbade-Dan MB
- 29 Ryu Yamamoto S
- 30 Masato Kai OH

=== Uzbekistan ===
The following is Uzbekistan's roster in the 2023 Men's Championship.

Head coach: Karimjon Rakhimkulov

- 1 Bunyod Egamkulov OP
- 2 Bunyodbek Khosinov OH
- 3 Umidjon Yuldashev OH
- 6 Sanjar Akhtamov MB
- 7 Azizbek Kuchkorov MB
- 8 Farrukh Khakimov OH
- 9 Fozil Khamroev OH
- 10 Khabibullokhon Isamov S
- 11 Javokhir Khushvaktov MB
- 12 Mukhammadal Rasulov S
- 13 Shokhrukh Temirov L
- 14 Umirbek Rakhimov OH

=== Thailand ===
The following is Thailand's roster in the 2023 Men's Championship.

Head coach: (South Korea) Park Ki-won

- 4 Anut Promchan OH
- 5 Takorn Chuaymee MB
- 8 Prasert Pinkaew MB
- 9 Napadet Bhinijdee OP
- 10 Boonyarid Wongtorn S
- 11 Siwadon Sanhatham L
- 12 Thanathat Thaweerat MB
- 13 Mawin Maneewong S
- 14 Tanapat Charoensuk L
- 16 Jakkrit Thanomnoi OH
- 19 Christopher Arli Upakam OP
- 20 Chayut Khongrueng MB
- 22 Anurak Phanram OH
- 23 Assanaphan Chantajorn OP

== Pool C ==
=== China ===
The following is China's roster in the 2023 Men's Championship.

Head coach: Hou Chundi

- 1 Wang Dongchen MB
- 4 Li Lei OH
- 5 Yang Yiming L
- 8 Guo Cheng S
- 18 Chen Leiyang S
- 19 Zhang Guanhua OP
- 21 Miao Ruantong MB
- 23 Wang Bin OH
- 25 Wen Zihua OP
- 26 Zhang Xinyu MB
- 27 Chen Xilong OH
- 28 Deng Xinpeng OH
- 31 Li Tianyue L
- 33 Chen Peiyu MB

=== Kazakhstan ===
The following is Kazakhstan's roster in the 2023 Men's Championship.

Head coach: (France) Boris Grebennikov

- 1 Yerikzhan Boken L
- 5 Boris Kempa OH
- 9 Sergey Okunev L
- 10 Zhaxsylyk Tleulin MB
- 12 Nodirkhan Kadirkhanov MB
- 13 Vladislav Kunchenko OH
- 17 Eduard Pogrebnyak MB
- 18 Vitaliy Vorivodin OH
- 21 Mikhail Ustinov OH
- 23 Askar Serik MB
- 24 Nurlibek Nurmakhambetov S
- 25 Ilya Tavolzhanskiy OP
- 55 Sergey Kuznetsov S
- 77 Maxim Michshenko OP

=== Indonesia ===
The following is Indonesia's roster in the 2023 Men's Championship.

Head coach: (China) Jiang Jie

- 1 Cep Indra Agustin MB
- 3 Boy Arnez Arabi OH
- 4 Hendra Kurniawan MB
- 6 Muhammad Malizi MB
- 8 Jasen Natanael Kilanta S
- 9 Doni Haryono OH
- 10 Fahri Septian Putratama OH
- 11 Amin Kurnia Sandi Akbar OH
- 13 Hernanda Zulfi MB
- 14 Farhan Halim OH
- 15 Dio Zulfikri S
- 17 Agil Angga Anggara OP
- 19 Fahreza Rakha Abhinaya L
- 20 Irpan L

== Pool D ==
=== Chinese Taipei ===
The following is Chinese Taipei's roster in the 2023 Men's Championship.

Head coach: (Serbia) Moro Branislav

- 1 Ko Kai-Jie S
- 2 Jhang Yun-Liang L
- 3 Li Chia-Hsuan L
- 6 Tai Ju-Chien S
- 9 Kao Wei-Cheng OH
- 11 Wu Tsung-Hsuan OP
- 12 Sung Po-Ting OH
- 13 Wu Cheng-Yang OH
- 14 Chang Yu-Sheng OP
- 15 Chan Min-Han OH
- 16 Yen Chen Fu MB
- 17 Lin Yi-Huei MB
- 19 Chen Chien Chen OH
- 20 Tsai Pei-Chang MB

=== Bahrain ===
The following is Bahrain's roster in the 2023 Men's Championship.

Head coach: (Argentina) Ruben Adrian Wolochin

- 2 Mohamed Anan OP
- 4 Abbas Al Khabbaz MB
- 6 Sayed Hashem Ali OH
- 7 Mahmood Alafyah S
- 8 Mahmood Abdulwahed OH
- 9 Mohamed Jasim MB
- 10 Husain Sultan L
- 11 Ali Habib S
- 13 Ali Ebrahim OP
- 14 Mahmood Abdulhusain OH
- 15 Naser Anan OH
- 17 Mohamed Yaqoob OH
- 18 Ayman Haroon L
- 21 Allawi Hani MB

== Pool E ==
=== Qatar ===
The following is Qatar's roster in the 2023 Men's Championship.

Head coach: (Argentina) Camilo Soto

- 1 Youssef Oughlaf OH
- 2 Papemaguette Diagne MB
- 4 Renan Ribeiro OH
- 6 Borislav Georgiev S
- 7 Belal Nabel Abunabot MB
- 8 Mohamed Widatalla OH
- 9 Milos Stevanovic S
- 11 Nikola Vasic OH
- 12 Mubarak Dahi OP
- 13 Raimi Wadidie OH
- 16 Mohammed Ibrahim MB
- 17 Ahmed Noaman Gamal MB
- 19 Naji Mahmoud L
- 20 Mohammed Alsharshani L

=== India ===
The following is India's roster in the 2023 Men's Championship.

Head coach: Jaideep Sarkar

=== Afghanistan ===
The following is Afghanistan's roster in the 2023 Men's Championship.

Head coach: (Iran) Mohammad Saber Noori

== Pool F ==
=== Pakistan ===
The following is Pakistan's roster in the 2023 Men's Championship.

Head coach: (Brazil) Issanaye Ramires Ferraz

=== South Korea ===
The following is South Korea's roster in the 2023 Men's Championship.

Head coach: Im Do-heon

- 1 Kim Kyu-min MB
- 2 Hwang Taek-eui S
- 5 Park Kyeong-min L
- 7 Heo Su-bong OP
- 8 Jung Ji-seok OH
- 9 Lim Sung-jin OH
- 10 Na Gyeong-Bok OH
- 11 Kim Min-jae MB
- 12 Jeon Kwang-in OH
- 15 Hwang Seung-bin S
- 16 Jeong Han-yong OH
- 17 Im Dong-hyeok OP
- 19 Lee Sang-uk L
- 20 Lee Sang-hyeon MB

=== Bangladesh ===
The following is Bangladesh's roster in the 2023 Men's Championship.

Head coach: (Iran) Ali Pour Aroji
