= 2021 Asian Men's Volleyball Championship squads =

Volleyball squads

This article shows the rosters of all participating teams at the 2021 Asian Men's Volleyball Championship in Japan.

== Pool A ==
=== Japan (H) ===
The following is the team roster for the 2021 Asian Men's Volleyball Championship.

Head Coach: (Japan) Yuichi Nakagaichi

| No. | Name | Position | Date of birth | Height | Weight | Spike | Block | 2021–22 club |
|---|---|---|---|---|---|---|---|---|
| 2 | Taishi Onodera | MB | 27 February 1996 | 2.01 m (6 ft 7 in) | 98 kg (216 lb) | 346 cm (136 in) | 323 cm (127 in) | (Japan) JT Thunders |
| 3 | Naonobu Fujii | S | 5 January 1992 | 1.83 m (6 ft 0 in) | 78 kg (172 lb) | 312 cm (123 in) | 297 cm (117 in) | (Japan) Toray Arrows |
| 4 | Issei Otake | OS | 3 December 1995 | 2.01 m (6 ft 7 in) | 98 kg (216 lb) | 345 cm (136 in) | 327 cm (129 in) | (Japan) Panasonic Panthers |
| 5 | Tatsunori Otsuka | WS/OH | 5 November 2000 | 1.94 m (6 ft 4 in) | 80 kg (180 lb) | 338 cm (133 in) | 325 cm (128 in) | (Japan) Waseda University |
| 6 | Akihiro Yamauchi | MB | 30 November 1993 | 2.04 m (6 ft 8 in) | 80 kg (180 lb) | 350 cm (140 in) | 335 cm (132 in) | (Japan) Panasonic Panthers |
| 7 | Kenta Takanashi | WS/OH | 25 March 1997 | 1.89 m (6 ft 2 in) | 78 kg (172 lb) | 337 cm (133 in) | 320 cm (130 in) | (Japan) Wolf Dogs Nagoya |
| 9 | Taichi Fukuyama | MB | 20 December 1993 | 1.91 m (6 ft 3 in) | 78 kg (172 lb) | 335 cm (132 in) | 325 cm (128 in) | (Japan) JTEKT Stings |
| 12 | Ran Takahashi | WS/OH | 2 September 2001 | 1.88 m (6 ft 2 in) | 72 kg (159 lb) | 343 cm (135 in) | 315 cm (124 in) | (Japan) Nippon Sport Science University |
| 13 | Masaki Oya | S | 23 April 1995 | 1.78 m (5 ft 10 in) | 70 kg (150 lb) | 320 cm (130 in) | 310 cm (120 in) | (Japan) Suntory Sunbirds |
| 14 | Yūki Ishikawa (c) | WS/OH | 11 December 1995 | 1.91 m (6 ft 3 in) | 84 kg (185 lb) | 351 cm (138 in) | 327 cm (129 in) | (Italy) Power Volley Milano |
| 15 | Haku Lee | MB | 27 December 1990 | 1.93 m (6 ft 4 in) | 82 kg (181 lb) | 344 cm (135 in) | 330 cm (130 in) | (Japan) Toray Arrows |
| 17 | Tomohiro Ogawa | L | 4 July 1996 | 1.76 m (5 ft 9 in) | 66 kg (146 lb) | 305 cm (120 in) | 270 cm (110 in) | (Japan) Wolf Dogs Nagoya |
| 19 | Kento Miyaura | OS | 22 February 1999 | 1.89 m (6 ft 2 in) | 73 kg (161 lb) | 339 cm (133 in) | 320 cm (130 in) | (Japan) JTEKT Stings |
| 20 | Tomohiro Yamamoto | L | 5 November 1994 | 1.71 m (5 ft 7 in) | 69 kg (152 lb) | 301 cm (119 in) | 299 cm (118 in) | (Japan) Sakai Blazers |

=== India ===
Head coach:

=== Qatar ===
Head coach:

=== Bahrain ===
Head coach:

== Pool B ==
=== Iran ===
The following is the Iranian roster in the 2021 Asian Men's Volleyball Championship.

Head coach: (Iran) Behrouz Ataei

| No. | Name | Date of birth | Height | Weight | Spike | Block | 2021–22 club |
|---|---|---|---|---|---|---|---|
| 1 | Mahdi Jelveh | 21 May 2001 | 2.08 m (6 ft 10 in) | 85 kg (187 lb) | 355 cm (140 in) | 330 cm (130 in) | (Iran) Foolad Sirjan |
| 2 | Milad Ebadipour | 17 October 1993 | 1.96 m (6 ft 5 in) | 78 kg (172 lb) | 350 cm (140 in) | 310 cm (120 in) | (Poland) Skra Bełchatów |
| 3 | Reza Abedini | 19 May 1991 | 2.03 m (6 ft 8 in) | 93 kg (205 lb) | 354 cm (139 in) | 348 cm (137 in) | (Iran) Shahdab Yazd |
| 5 | Amir Hossein Toukhteh | 9 April 2001 | 2.03 m (6 ft 8 in) | 79 kg (174 lb) | 350 cm (140 in) | 325 cm (128 in) | (Slovenia) ACH Volley |
| 6 | Aliasghar Mojarad | 30 October 1997 | 2.05 m (6 ft 9 in) | 90 kg (200 lb) | 330 cm (130 in) | 310 cm (120 in) | (Iran) Shahrdari Urmia |
| 7 | Esmaeil Mosafer | 21 November 1997 | 1.92 m (6 ft 4 in) | 71 kg (157 lb) | 310 cm (120 in) | 290 cm (110 in) | (Iran) Paykan Tehran |
| 8 | Mohammad Reza Hazratpour | 31 March 1999 | 1.87 m (6 ft 2 in) | 87 kg (192 lb) | 300 cm (120 in) | 290 cm (110 in) | (Iran) Shahrdari Urmia |
| 10 | Meisam Salehi | 17 November 1998 | 1.98 m (6 ft 6 in) | 89 kg (196 lb) | 345 cm (136 in) | 330 cm (130 in) | (Poland) AZS Olsztyn |
| 11 | Saber Kazemi | 24 December 1998 | 2.05 m (6 ft 9 in) | 87 kg (192 lb) | 340 cm (130 in) | 325 cm (128 in) | (Iran) Foolad Sirjan |
| 12 | Amir Hossein Esfandiar | 24 January 1999 | 2.05 m (6 ft 9 in) | 110 kg (240 lb) | 330 cm (130 in) | 310 cm (120 in) | (Belgium) Greenyard Maaseik |
| 13 | Ali Ramezani | 5 May 1998 | 2.00 m (6 ft 7 in) | 103 kg (227 lb) | 330 cm (130 in) | 310 cm (120 in) | (Iran) Labanyat Haraz Amol |
| 14 | Javad Karimi | 1 March 1998 | 2.04 m (6 ft 8 in) | 104 kg (229 lb) | 330 cm (130 in) | 310 cm (120 in) | (Belgium) Greenyard Maaseik |
| 17 | Amin Esmaeilnejad | 17 December 1996 | 2.03 m (6 ft 8 in) | —N/a | —N/a | —N/a | (Iran) Shahdab Yazd |
| 19 | Abolfazl Gholipour | 21 January 1993 | 1.78 m (5 ft 10 in) | 63 kg (139 lb) | 295 cm (116 in) | 275 cm (108 in) | (Iran) Rahyab Melal Marivan |

=== Pakistan ===
The following is the Pakistani roster in the 2021 Asian Men's Volleyball Championship.

Head Coach: Rahman Mohammadirad

| No. | Name | Date of birth | Height | Weight | Spike | Block | 2020–21 club |
|---|---|---|---|---|---|---|---|
| 3 | Usman Faryad Ali | 22 May 1999 | 1.93 m (6 ft 4 in) | 70 kg (150 lb) | 326 cm (128 in) | 306 cm (120 in) | —N/a |
| 6 | Sheraz Sheraz | 27 October 1993 | 1.99 m (6 ft 6 in) | 81 kg (179 lb) | 324 cm (128 in) | 295 cm (116 in) | —N/a |
| 7 | Mubashir Raza | 1 January 1992 | 1.91 m (6 ft 3 in) | 84 kg (185 lb) | 320 cm (130 in) | 290 cm (110 in) | —N/a |
| 8 | Khan Aimal (c) | 10 August 1990 | 2.04 m (6 ft 8 in) | 80 kg (180 lb) | 335 cm (132 in) | 310 cm (120 in) | (Qatar) Al-Gharafa SC |
| 9 | Fakhar Ud Din | 1 December 1995 | 1.92 m (6 ft 4 in) | 91 kg (201 lb) | 340 cm (130 in) | 310 cm (120 in) | —N/a |
| 13 | Muhammad Kashif Naveed | 1 January 1994 | 1.9 m (6 ft 3 in) | 79 kg (174 lb) | 305 cm (120 in) | 285 cm (112 in) | —N/a |
| 14 | Abdul Zaheer | 25 February 1996 | 2.01 m (6 ft 7 in) | 89 kg (196 lb) | 340 cm (130 in) | 315 cm (124 in) | —N/a |
| 18 | Nasir Ali | 12 May 1992 | 1.74 m (5 ft 9 in) | 65 kg (143 lb) | 290 cm (110 in) | 271 cm (107 in) | —N/a |
| —N/a | Musawer Khan | —N/a | —N/a | —N/a | —N/a | —N/a | —N/a |
| —N/a | Muhammad Hamad | 18 February 1998 | 1.95 m (6 ft 5 in) | 70 kg (150 lb) | 319 cm (126 in) | 303 cm (119 in) | —N/a |
| —N/a | Maaz Ullah Khan | —N/a | —N/a | —N/a | —N/a | —N/a | —N/a |
| —N/a | Hamid Yazman | 20 March 1998 | 1.93 m (6 ft 4 in) | 71 kg (157 lb) | 323 cm (127 in) | 296 cm (117 in) | —N/a |
| —N/a | Murad Khan | 2 March 2000 | 2.04 m (6 ft 8 in) | 90 kg (200 lb) | 342 cm (135 in) | 335 cm (132 in) | —N/a |
| —N/a | Afaq Khan | 26 March 2000 | 1.96 m (6 ft 5 in) | 65 kg (143 lb) | —N/a | —N/a | —N/a |

=== Thailand ===
Head coach:

=== Hong Kong ===
Head Coach:

== Pool C ==
=== Australia ===
Head coach:

=== China ===
Head coach:

=== Sri Lanka ===
Head coach:

=== Kuwait ===
Head coach:

== Pool D ==
=== South Korea ===
Head coach: (South Korea) Park Sam-ryong

=== Chinese Taipei ===
Head coach:

=== Kazakhstan ===
Head coach:

=== Saudi Arabia ===
Head coach:
