= Japan men's national volleyball team =

Men's national volleyball team representing Japan

Japan
- Nickname(s): Ryujin Nippon
- Association: Japan Volleyball Association (JVA)
- Confederation: AVC
- Head coach: Laurent Tillie
- FIVB ranking: 5 ▲1 (1 October 2026)

Uniforms
Home	Away	Third

Summer Olympics
- Appearances: 10 (First in 1964)
- Best result: (1972)

World Championship
- Appearances: 18 (First in 1960)
- Best result: (1970, 1974)

World Cup
- Appearances: 16 (First in 1965)
- Best result: (1969, 1977)

Asian Championship
- Appearances: 22 (First in 1975)
- Best result: (1975, 1983, 1987, 1991, 1995, 2005, 2009, 2015, 2017, 2023, 2026)
- www.jva.or.jp/national_team/2024/men_member/ (in Japanese)
Honours
Event	1st	2nd	3rd
Olympic Games	1	1	1
World Championship	0	0	2
World Cup	0	3	0
World Grand Champions Cup	0	0	1
Nations League	0	1	1
Asian Championship	11	4	4
Asian Games	8	2	3
Asian Cup	0	1	3
Eastern Asian Championship	6	0	4
Universiade	3	3	4
Total	29	15	23
Medal record
Olympic Games
Gold medal – first place	1972 Munich	Team
Silver medal – second place	1968 Mexico City	Team
Bronze medal – third place	1964 Tokyo	Team
World Championship
Bronze medal – third place	1970 Sofia	Team
Bronze medal – third place	1974 Mexico City	Team
World Cup
Silver medal – second place	1969 East Germany	Team
Silver medal – second place	1977 Japan	Team
World Grand Champions Cup
Bronze medal – third place	2009 Osaka/Nagoya	Team
Nations League
Silver medal – second place	2024 Łódź	Team
Bronze medal – third place	2023 Gdańsk	Team
Asian Championship
Gold medal – first place	1975 Melbourne	Team
Gold medal – first place	1983 Tokyo	Team
Gold medal – first place	1987 Kuwait City	Team
Gold medal – first place	1991 Perth	Team
Gold medal – first place	1995 Seoul	Team
Gold medal – first place	2005 Suphanburi	Team
Gold medal – first place	2009 Manila	Team
Gold medal – first place	2015 Tehran	Team
Gold medal – first place	2017 Gresik	Team
Gold medal – first place	2023 Urmia	Team
Gold medal – first place	2026 Kitakyushu	Team
Silver medal – second place	1989 Seoul	Team
Silver medal – second place	1997 Doha	Team
Silver medal – second place	2007 Jakarta	Team
Silver medal – second place	2021 Chiba/Funabashi	Team
Bronze medal – third place	1979 Manama	Team
Bronze medal – third place	1993 Nakhon Ratchasima	Team
Bronze medal – third place	2001 Changwon	Team
Bronze medal – third place	2019 Tehran	Team
Asian Games
Gold medal – first place	1958 Tokyo	Team
Gold medal – first place	1962 Jakarta	Team
Gold medal – first place	1966 Bangkok	Team
Gold medal – first place	1970 Bangkok	Team
Gold medal – first place	1974 Tehran	Team
Gold medal – first place	1982 New Delhi	Team
Gold medal – first place	1994 Hiroshima	Team
Gold medal – first place	2010 Guangzhou	Team
Silver medal – second place	1978 Bangkok	Team
Silver medal – second place	2014 Incheon	Team
Bronze medal – third place	1990 Beijing	Team
Bronze medal – third place	2022 Hangzhou	Team
Bronze medal – third place	2002 Busan	Team
Asian Cup
Silver medal – second place	2022 Nakhon Pathom	Team
Bronze medal – third place	2012 Vinh Yen	Team
Bronze medal – third place	2016 Nakhon Pathom	Team
Bronze medal – third place	2018 Taipei	Team
Eastern Asian Championship
Gold medal – first place	1998 Macau	Team
Gold medal – first place	2000 Ulaanbaatar	Team
Gold medal – first place	2004 Taicang	Team
Gold medal – first place	2006 Pingtung	Team
Gold medal – first place	2015 Ulaanbaatar	Team
Gold medal – first place	2017 Ulaanbaatar	Team
Silver medal – second place	2026 Ulaanbaatar	Team
Bronze medal – third place	2002 Shanghai	Team
Bronze medal – third place	2008 Ulaanbaatar	Team
Bronze medal – third place	2010 Jeju	Team
Bronze medal – third place	2013 Taipei	Team
Universiade
Gold medal – first place	1967 Tokyo	Team
Gold medal – first place	1985 Kobe	Team
Gold medal – first place	1993 Buffalo	Team
Silver medal – second place	1999 Palma de Mallorca	Team
Silver medal – second place	2003 Daegu	Team
Silver medal – second place	2005 Izmir	Team
Bronze medal – third place	1979 Mexico City	Team
Bronze medal – third place	1981 Bucharest	Team
Bronze medal – third place	2013 Kazan	Team
Bronze medal – third place	2017 Taipei	Team
Goodwill Games
Bronze medal – third place	1986 Moscow	Team

The Japan men's national volleyball team (Japanese: 男子バレーボール日本代表), also referred to as Ryujin Nippon (Japanese: 龍神ニッポン; Lit. trans: Dragon God of Japan) or simply Nippon, represents Japan in international volleyball competitions and friendly matches, governed by Japan Volleyball Association. As of September 2024, the team is ranked sixth in the FIVB Senior World Rankings, with their peak coming at second place prior to the 2024 Summer Olympics.

Japan first won a bronze medal at the Tokyo 1964 Olympic Games, followed by silver at Mexico 1968 and a gold at Munich 1972. In the years that followed, Japan has been unsuccessful and missed three successive Olympic Games before returning at Beijing 2008, where they failed to win a match. Japan then failed to qualify for London 2012 and Rio 2016. At the FIVB World Championship, Japan has won bronze medals in 1970 and 1974, as well as silver medals at the 1969 and 1977 FIVB World Cup.

At the 2020 Summer Olympics in Tokyo, Japan and the 2024 Summer Olympics in Paris, France, Japan advanced to the Quarterfinals round and eventually finished in seventh place, its best result since the 1992 Summer Olympics in Barcelona, Spain. As of the last 3 years, the team has been successful in the world leagues as they have achieved both bronze and silver medals at the 2023 FIVB Men's Volleyball Nations League and the 2024 edition, respectively. These results have been the nation's best since the tournament's creation in 2017.

== Medals ==
Event	Gold	Silver	Bronze	Total
Olympic Games	1	1	1	3
World Championship	2	0	2	4
World Cup	3	3	0	6
World Grand Champions Cup	4	0	1	5
Nations League	1	1	1	3
Asian Games	8	2	3	13
Asian Championship	10	4	4	18
Asian Cup	9	1	3	13
Eastern Asian Championship	6	0	4	10
Universiade	3	3	4	10
Goodwill Games	2	0	1	1
Total	28	15	23	66

== Competitive records ==
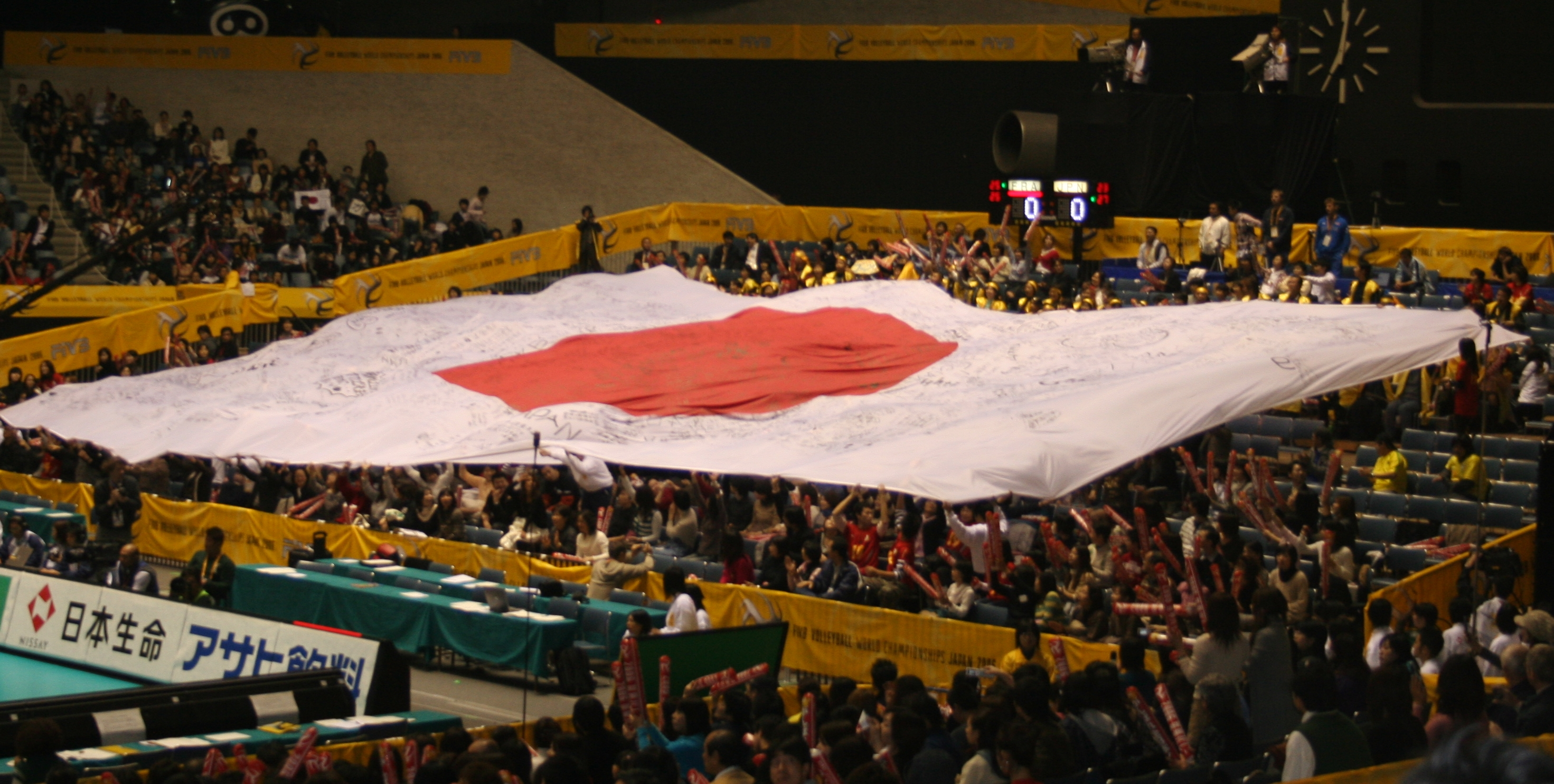
Japan national team fans in World Championship 2010

=== Olympic Games ===
Champions Runners-up 3rd place 4th place

Olympic Games record									Qualification record				
Year	Round	Position	GP	MW	ML	SW	SL	Squad	GP	MW	ML	SW	SL
(Japan) 1964	Round robin	3rd	9	7	2	22	12	Squad	Qualified as host				
(Mexico) 1968	Round robin	2nd	9	7	2	24	6	Squad	Unknown asian qualifier				
(Germany) 1972	Final	1st	7	7	0	21	3	Squad	1970 World Championship				
(Canada) 1976	Semifinals	4th	5	2	3	8	9	Squad	Qualified as defending champions				
(Soviet Union) 1980	Did not participate due to US-led boycott								4	1	3	8	9
(United States) 1984	Preliminary round	7th	6	4	2	13	8	Squad	1983 Asian Championship				
(South Korea) 1988	Preliminary round	10th	7	2	5	10	17	Squad	1987 Asian Championship				
(Spain) 1992	Preliminary round	6th	8	3	5	13	20	Squad	1991 Asian Championship				
(United States) 1996	Did not qualify								9	5	4	19	14
(Australia) 2000	Did not qualify								6	4	2	12	9
(Greece) 2004	Did not qualify								7	2	5	14	15
(China) 2008	Preliminary round	11th	5	0	5	4	15	Squad	7	6	1	20	7
(United Kingdom) 2012	Did not qualify								7	4	3	13	12
(Brazil) 2016	Did not qualify								7	2	5	8	16
(Japan) 2020	Quarterfinals	7th	6	3	3	10	12	Squad	Qualified as host				
(France) 2024	Quarterfinals	7th	4	1	3	8	10	Squad	7	5	2	19	8
(United States) 2028	Qualified								2026 AVC Continental Championship				
(Australia) 2032	To be determined								To be determined				
Total	1 Title	10/17	66	36	30	133	112	—	54	29	25	113	90

=== World Cup ===
Champions Runners-up Third place Fourth place

World Cup record
Year	Round	Position	GP	MW	ML	SW	SL	Squad
(Czechoslovakia) 1949	did not participate							
(Soviet Union) 1952	did not participate							
(France) 1956	did not participate							
(Brazil) 1960	Final Group	8th	9	2	7	8	21	Squad
(Soviet Union) 1962	Final Group	5th	9	5	4	21	20	Squad
(Czechoslovakia) 1966	Group Round	5th	7	4	3	17	17	Squad
(Bulgaria) 1970	Semifinals	3rd	11	9	2	30	8	Squad
(Mexico) 1974	Semifinals	3rd	11	9	2	28	13	Squad
(Italy) 1978	Second round	11th	9	5	4	19	15	Squad
(Argentina) 1982	Semifinals	4th	9	7	2	22	10	Squad
(France) 1986	Second round	10th	9	2	7	9	23	Squad
(Brazil) 1990	First round	11th	4	1	3	3	9	Squad
(Greece) 1994	Last 16	9th	4	1	3	4	11	Squad
(Japan) 1998	Preliminary round	15th	10	2	8	15	24	Squad
(Argentina) 2002	Second round	9th	6	2	4	11	15	Squad
(Japan) 2006	5th–8th semifinals	8th	14	7	7	2	30	Squad
(Italy) 2010	Second round	13th	5	1	4	5	14	Squad
(Poland) 2014	did not qualify							
(Italy) (Bulgaria) 2018	First round	17th	5	2	3	8	11	Squad
(Poland) (Slovenia) 2022	Round of 16	12th	4	2	2	8	7	Squad
(Philippines) 2025	Preliminary round	23rd	3	1	2	3	6	Squad
(Poland) 2027	Qualified							
(Qatar) 2029	Future event							
Total	0 Title	17/21	129	62	67	236	254	—

=== World Cup (1965–2019) ===
Champions Runners-up Third place Fourth place

World Cup (1965–2019) record (Defunct)
Year	Round	Position	GP	MW	ML	SW	SL	Squad
(Poland) 1965	Semifinals	4th	7	3	4	13	17	Squad
(East Germany) 1969	Final	2nd	8	6	2	20	12	Squad
(Japan) 1977	Final	2nd	8	5	3	19	14	Squad
(Japan) 1981	Second round	6th	7	2	5	12	15	Squad
(Japan) 1985	Seventh round	6th	7	2	5	9	15	Squad
(Japan) 1989	Seventh round	6th	7	2	5	10	16	Squad
(Japan) 1991	Matches for places 1-6	4th	5	1	4	7	13	Squad
(Japan) 1995	Fourth round	5th	11	7	4	21	13	Squad
(Japan) 1999	Fourth round	10th	11	3	8	16	27	Squad
(Japan) 2003	Fourth round	9th	11	3	8	14	27	Squad
(Japan) 2007	Fourth round	9th	11	3	8	14	26	Squad
(Japan) 2011	Fourth round	10th	11	2	9	12	28	Squad
(Japan) 2015	Third round	6th	11	5	6	21	21	Squad
(Japan) 2019	Round robin	4th	11	8	3	26	16	Squad
Total	0 Title	15/15	133	57	76	233	268	—

=== World Grand Champions Cup ===
Champions Runners-up Third place Fourth place

World Grand Champions record (Defunct)
Year	Round	Position	GP	MW	ML	SW	SL	Squad
(Japan) 1993	Round Robin	4th	5	2	3	9	10	Squad
(Japan) 1997	Round Robin	5th	5	1	4	8	12	Squad
(Japan) 2001	Round Robin	5th	5	1	4	4	14	Squad
(Japan) 2005	Round Robin	4th	5	2	3	8	13	Squad
(Japan) 2009	Round Robin	3rd	5	3	2	9	11	Squad
(Japan) 2013	Round Robin	6th	5	0	5	1	15	Squad
(Japan) 2017	Round Robin	6th	5	0	5	2	15	Squad
Total	0 Titles	7/7	35	9	26	41	90	—

=== World League ===
Champions Runners-up Third place Fourth place

World League record (Defunct)
Year	Round	Position	GP	MW	ML	SW	SL	Squad
(Japan) 1990	Intercontinental round	6th	12	5	7	16	23	Squad
(Italy) 1991	Intercontinental Round	7th	16	5	11	22	38	Squad
(Italy) 1992	Intercontinental Round	10th	12	2	10	13	31	Squad
(Brazil) 1993	Intercontinental Round	6th	20	10	10	36	41	Squad
(Italy) 1994	Intercontinental Round	8th	12	4	8	16	26	Squad
(Brazil) 1995	Intercontinental Round	8th	12	4	8	18	27	Squad
(Netherlands) 1996	Intercontinental Round	9th	12	3	9	16	31	Squad
(Russia) 1997	Intercontinental Round	12th	12	0	12	3	36	Squad
(Italy) 1998	did not participate							
(Argentina) 1999	did not participate							
(Netherlands) 2000	did not participate							
(Poland) 2001	Intercontinental Round	9th	12	3	9	15	28	Squad
(Brazil) 2002	Intercontinental Round	13th	12	1	11	11	34	Squad
(Spain) 2003	Intercontinental Round	13th	12	3	9	16	31	Squad
(Italy) 2004	Intercontinental Round	10th	12	0	12	8	36	Squad
(Serbia and Montenegro) 2005	Intercontinental Round	10th	12	2	10	9	32	Squad
(Russia) 2006	Intercontinental Round	13th	12	1	11	11	33	Squad
(Poland) 2007	Intercontinental Round	13th	12	3	9	17	32	Squad
(Brazil) 2008	Pool play	6th	14	5	9	22	34	Squad
(Serbia) 2009	Intercontinental Round	15th	12	3	9	13	31	Squad
(Argentina) 2010	did not qualify							
(Poland) 2011	Intercontinental Round	15th	12	1	11	10	35	Squad
(Poland) 2012	Intercontinental Round	15th	12	0	12	11	36	Squad
(Argentina) 2013	Intercontinental Round	18th	10	3	7	16	25	Squad
(Italy) 2014	Intercontinental Round	19th	12	1	11	8	35	Squad
(Brazil) 2015	Intercontinental Round	13th	12	5	7	19	23	Squad
(Poland) 2016	Intercontinental Round	24th	9	2	7	14	21	Squad
(Brazil) 2017	Group Final Round	14th	11	6	5	24	23	Squad
Total	0 Titles	24/28	296	72	224	364	742	—

=== Nations League ===
Champions Runners-up Third place Fourth place

Nations League record
Year	Round	Position	GP	MW	ML	SW	SL	Squad
(France) 2018	Preliminary round	12th	15	6	9	23	37	Squad
(United States) 2019	Preliminary round	10th	15	7	8	27	32	Squad
(Italy) 2021	Preliminary round	11th	15	7	8	25	31	Squad
(Italy) 2022	Quarterfinals	5th	13	9	4	29	21	Squad
(Poland) 2023	Semifinals	Third place	15	12	3	38	21	Squad
(Poland) 2024	Final	Runners-up	15	11	4	37	20	Squad
(China) 2025	Quarterfinals	6th	13	8	5	27	20	Squad
(China) 2026	Semifinals	4th	15	13	2	42	22	Squad
Total	0 Titles	8/8	116	73	43	248	204	—

=== AVC Continental Championship ===
Champions Runners-up Third place Fourth place

AVC Continental Championship record
Year	Round	Position	GP	MW	ML	SW	SL	Squad
(Australia) 1975	Final	1st	6	6	0	18	1	Squad
(Bahrain) 1979	Championship round	3rd	5	3	2	12	6	Squad
(Japan) 1983	Final	1st	7	7	0	21	4	Squad
(Kuwait) 1987	Final	1st	8	8	0	N/A	N/A	Squad
(South Korea) 1989	Final	2nd	8	7	1	21	3	Squad
(Australia) 1991	Final	1st	7	7	0	21	3	Squad
(Thailand) 1993	Semifinals	3rd	6	5	1	15	3	Squad
(South Korea) 1995	Final	1st	5	5	0	N/A	N/A	Squad
(Qatar) 1997	Final	2nd	5	4	1	13	4	Squad
(Iran) 1999	Championship round	4th	7	5	2	16	9	Squad
(South Korea) 2001	Semifinals	3rd	6	5	1	15	6	Squad
(China) 2003	Quarterfinals	7th	7	4	3	15	10	Squad
(Thailand) 2005	Final	1st	8	7	1	23	6	Squad
(Indonesia) 2007	Final	2nd	7	5	2	17	7	Squad
(Philippines) 2009	Final	1st	7	7	0	21	4	Squad
(Iran) 2011	Quarterfinals	5th	8	5	3	18	13	Squad
(United Arab Emirates) 2013	Semifinals	4th	7	4	3	14	9	Squad
(Iran) 2015	Final	1st	8	5	3	19	14	Squad
(Indonesia) 2017	Final	1st	8	7	1	23	4	Squad
(Iran) 2019	Semifinals	3rd	8	6	2	22	9	Squad
(Japan) 2021	Final	2nd	8	6	2	19	8	Squad
(Iran) 2023	Final	1st	5	5	0	15	1	Squad
(Japan) 2026	Final	1st	6	6	0	18	1	Squad
Total	11 Titles	23/23	149	123	26	357	117	—

=== Asian Games ===
Champions Runners-up Third place Fourth place

Asian Games record
Year	Round	Position	GP	MW	ML	SW	SL	Squad
(Japan) 1958	Final	1st	4	4	0	12	2	Squads
(Indonesia) 1962	Final	1st	7	7	0	21	4	Squads
(Thailand) 1966	Final	1st	8	8	0	26	0	Squads
(Thailand) 1970	Final	1st	7	7	0	21	0	Squads
(Iran) 1974	Final	1st	5	5	0	15	1	Squads
(Thailand) 1978	Final	2nd	9	8	1	24	4	Squads
(India) 1982	Final	1st	6	6	0	18	1	Squads
(South Korea) 1986	Final Round	4th	8	4	4	22	9	Squads
(China) 1990	Semifinals	3rd	5	3	2	11	6	Squads
(Japan) 1994	Final	1st	5	4	1	13	5	Squads
(Thailand) 1998	Final Round	4th	6	3	3	13	9	Squads
(South Korea) 2002	Semifinals	3rd	5	3	2	10	10	Squads
(Qatar) 2006	Quarterfinals	5th	3	2	1	6	5	Squads
(China) 2010	Final	1st	10	8	2	27	9	Squads
(South Korea) 2014	Final	2nd	9	8	1	25	8	Squads
(Indonesia) 2018	Quarterfinals	5th	5	4	1	14	10	Squads
(China) 2022	Semifinals	3rd	7	6	1	18	4	Squads
(Japan) 2026	Qualified as host							
Total	8 Titles	17/17	109	90	19	296	87	—

=== AVC Cup for Men ===
Champions Runners-up Third place Fourth place

AVC Cup for Men record (Defunct)
Year	Round	Position	GP	MW	ML	SW	SL	Squad
(Thailand) 2008	Semifinals	4th	6	4	2	13	11	Squad
(Iran) 2010	Quarterfinals	8th	6	0	6	4	18	Squad
(Vietnam) 2012	Semifinals	3rd	6	5	1	15	4	Squad
(Kazakhstan) 2014	Quarterfinals	6th	6	1	5	5	17	Squad
(Thailand) 2016	Semifinals	3rd	6	3	3	13	11	Squad
(Taiwan) 2018	Semifinals	3rd	5	2	3	10	12	Squad
(Thailand) 2022	Final	2nd	6	4	2	14	6	Squad
Total	0 Titles	7/7	41	19	22	74	79	—

=== Goodwill Games ===
Champions Runners-up Third place Fourth place

Goodwill Games record
Year	Round	Position	GP	MW	ML	SW	SL	Squad
(Soviet Union) 1986	Semifinals	3rd place	N/A					
(United States) 1990	did not participate							
Total	0 Titles	1/2	—N/a	—N/a	—N/a	—N/a	—N/a	—

== 2026 Results and fixtures ==
#	Opponent	Date	Result	Host city	Tournament
1	Ukraine	10 Jun	3–0 (25–22, 25–21, 25–22)	(China) Linyi	2026 Nations League
2	Poland	12 Jun	3–2 (25–21, 21–25, 25–21, 22–25, 17–15)	(China) Linyi	2026 Nations League
3	China	13 Jun	3–1 (25–23, 25–22, 20–25, 25–21)	(China) Linyi	2026 Nations League
4	Slovenia	14 Jun	3–1 (25–27, 25–16, 25–22, 25–22)	(China) Linyi	2026 Nations League
5	Serbia	24 Jun	3–1 (25–17, 25–15, 22–25, 25–16)	(France) Orléans	2026 Nations League
6	Iran	26 Jun	3–2 (25–19, 25–19, 20–25, 23–25, 15–12)	(France) Orléans	2026 Nations League
7	United States	27 Jun	3–2 (18–25, 25–21, 20–25, 25–22, 15–13)	(France) Orléans	2026 Nations League
8	France	28 Jun	3–2 (28–30, 19–25, 25–17, 35–33, 15–12)	(France) Orléans	2026 Nations League
9	Italy	15 Jul	3–2 (24–26, 25–19, 25–20, 23–25, 15–12)	(Japan) Osaka	2026 Nations League
10	Canada	16 Jul	3–2 (18–25, 24–26, 29–27, 25–19, 15–12)	(Japan) Osaka	2026 Nations League
11	Belgium	17 Jul	3–0 (25–20, 25–22, 25–16)	(Japan) Osaka	2026 Nations League
12	Argentina	19 Jul	3–0 (25–22, 25–22, 25–16)	(Japan) Osaka	2026 Nations League
13	China	29 Jul	3–1 (23–25, 25–23, 25–16, 25–23)	(China) Ningbo	2026 Nations League
14	United States	1 Aug	2–3 (19–25, 25–23, 25–20, 19–25, 13-15)	(China) Ningbo	2026 Nations League
15	Slovenia	2 Aug	1–3 (21–25, 28–26, 22–25, 22–25)	(China) Ningbo	2026 Nations League
16	Iran	3 Oct	1–3 (26–28, 25–19, 21–25, 24–26)	(Japan) Nagoya	2026 Asian Games
Head coach: (France) Laurent Tillie				(Japan) Nagoya	2026 Asian Games

== Team ==
=== Current squad ===
The following is the Japanese wide roster for the 2026 season (announced April 17, 2026).

Head coach: (France) Laurent Tillie

- 1 Yuji Nishida OP
- 2 Taishi Onodera MB
- 3 Hideomi Fukatsu S
- 4 Kento Miyaura OP
- 5 Tatsunori Otsuka OH
- 6 Akihiro Yamauchi MB
- 7 Yudai Arai OH
- 8 Masahiro Sekita S
- 9 Yudai Kawahigashi S
- 10 Kentaro Takahashi MB
- 11 Shoma Tomita OH
- 12 Ran Takahashi OH
- 13 Tomohiro Ogawa L
- 14 Yūki Ishikawa OH
- 15 Kai Masato OH
- 16 Go Murayama MB
- 17 Keigo Nishimoto MB
- 18 Hiroto Nishiyama OP
- 19 Kazuma Sonae L
- 20 Tomohiro Yamamoto L
- 21 Motoki Eiro S
- 22 Alain De Armas OH
- 23 Larry Evbade-Dan MB
- 24 Keihan Takahashi OP
- 25 Ryo Shimokawa S
- 26 Rikuto Goto OH
- 27 Taishu Takeda L
- 28 Kento Asano MB
- 29 Hiromasa Miwa MB
- 30 Keitaro Nishikawa MB
- 31 Yuji Kudo OH
- 33 Takuma Kawano OH
- 34 Ren Ichinose OH
- 35 Riku Ito MB
- 36 Daiki Yamada OH
- 37 Kazuyuki Takahashi L
2026 Volleyball Nations League

The following is the Japanese wide roster for the 2026 Volleyball Nations League.

Head coach: (France) Laurent Tillie

No.	Name	Pos.	Date of birth	Height	Weight	Spike	Block	2026–27 club
1	Yuji Nishida	OP	January 30, 2000 (age 26)	1.87 m (6 ft 2 in)	87 kg (192 lb)	346 cm (136 in)	330 cm (130 in)	(Japan) Osaka Bluteon
2	Taishi Onodera	MB	February 27, 1996 (age 30)	2.02 m (6 ft 8 in)	94 kg (207 lb)	343 cm (135 in)	330 cm (130 in)	(Japan) Suntory Sunbirds
3	Hideomi Fukatsu	S	June 1, 1990 (age 36)	1.81 m (5 ft 11 in)	70 kg (150 lb)	325 cm (128 in)	305 cm (120 in)	(Japan) Wolfdogs Nagoya
4	Kento Miyaura	OP	February 22, 1999 (age 27)	1.90 m (6 ft 3 in)	87 kg (192 lb)	347 cm (137 in)	320 cm (130 in)	(Japan) Wolfdogs Nagoya
5	Tatsunori Otsuka	OH	November 5, 2000 (age 25)	1.95 m (6 ft 5 in)	90 kg (200 lb)	340 cm (130 in)	325 cm (128 in)	(Italy) Power Volley Milano
6	Akihiro Yamauchi	MB	November 30, 1993 (age 32)	2.04 m (6 ft 8 in)	85 kg (187 lb)	354 cm (139 in)	335 cm (132 in)	(Japan) Osaka Bluteon
10	Kentaro Takahashi	MB	February 8, 1995 (age 31)	2.01 m (6 ft 7 in)	93 kg (205 lb)	361 cm (142 in)	350 cm (140 in)	(Japan) JTEKT Stings
11	Shoma Tomita	OH	June 20, 1997 (age 29)	1.90 m (6 ft 3 in)	80 kg (180 lb)	342 cm (135 in)	320 cm (130 in)	(Japan) Osaka Bluteon
12	Ran Takahashi	OH	September 2, 2001 (age 25)	1.88 m (6 ft 2 in)	72 kg (159 lb)	343 cm (135 in)	315 cm (124 in)	(Poland) LKPS Lublin
13	Tomohiro Ogawa	L	July 4, 1996 (age 30)	1.82 m (6 ft 0 in)	67 kg (148 lb)	312 cm (123 in)	290 cm (110 in)	(Poland) LKPS Lublin
14	Yūki Ishikawa (c)	OH	December 11, 1995 (age 30)	1.92 m (6 ft 4 in)	84 kg (185 lb)	351 cm (138 in)	327 cm (129 in)	(Turkey) Ziraat Bankkart
15	Masato Kai	OH	September 25, 2003 (age 23)	2.00 m (6 ft 7 in)	79 kg (174 lb)	352 cm (139 in)	330 cm (130 in)	(Japan) Osaka Bluteon
17	Keigo Nishimoto	MB	October 27, 1998 (age 27)	1.88 m (6 ft 2 in)	93 kg (205 lb)	355 cm (140 in)	325 cm (128 in)	(Japan) Hiroshima Thunders
20	Tomohiro Yamamoto	L	November 5, 1994 (age 31)	1.71 m (5 ft 7 in)	69 kg (152 lb)	301 cm (119 in)	299 cm (118 in)	(Japan) Osaka Bluteon
21	Motoki Eiro	S	June 8, 1996 (age 30)	1.92 m (6 ft 4 in)	80 kg (180 lb)	330 cm (130 in)	320 cm (130 in)	(Japan) Hiroshima Thunders
23	Larry Evbade-Dan	MB	August 18, 2000 (age 26)	1.95 m (6 ft 5 in)	81 kg (179 lb)	350 cm (140 in)	333 cm (131 in)	(Japan) Osaka Bluteon

2026 AVC Men's Volleyball Continental Championship

The following is the Japanese wide roster for the 2026 AVC Men's Volleyball Continental Championship (announced September 3, 2026).

Head coach: (France) Laurent Tillie

No.	Name	Pos.	Date of birth	Height	Weight	Spike	Block	2026–27 club
1	Yuji Nishida	OP	January 30, 2000 (age 26)	1.87 m (6 ft 2 in)	87 kg (192 lb)	346 cm (136 in)	330 cm (130 in)	(Japan) Osaka Bluteon
2	Taishi Onodera	MB	February 27, 1996 (age 30)	2.02 m (6 ft 8 in)	94 kg (207 lb)	343 cm (135 in)	330 cm (130 in)	(Japan) Suntory Sunbirds
3	Hideomi Fukatsu	S	June 1, 1990 (age 36)	1.81 m (5 ft 11 in)	70 kg (150 lb)	325 cm (128 in)	305 cm (120 in)	(Japan) Wolfdogs Nagoya
4	Kento Miyaura	OP	February 22, 1999 (age 27)	1.90 m (6 ft 3 in)	87 kg (192 lb)	347 cm (137 in)	320 cm (130 in)	(Japan) Wolfdogs Nagoya
5	Tatsunori Otsuka	OH	November 5, 2000 (age 25)	1.95 m (6 ft 5 in)	90 kg (200 lb)	340 cm (130 in)	325 cm (128 in)	(Italy) Power Volley Milano
6	Akihiro Yamauchi	MB	November 30, 1993 (age 32)	2.04 m (6 ft 8 in)	85 kg (187 lb)	354 cm (139 in)	335 cm (132 in)	(Japan) Osaka Bluteon
9	Yudai Kawahigashi	S	February 7, 1998 (age 28)	1.75 m (5 ft 9 in)	72 kg (159 lb)	315 cm (124 in)	-	(Japan) JTEKT Stings
11	Shoma Tomita	OH	June 20, 1997 (age 29)	1.90 m (6 ft 3 in)	80 kg (180 lb)	342 cm (135 in)	320 cm (130 in)	(Japan) Osaka Bluteon
12	Ran Takahashi	OH	September 2, 2001 (age 25)	1.88 m (6 ft 2 in)	72 kg (159 lb)	343 cm (135 in)	315 cm (124 in)	(Poland) LKPS Lublin
13	Tomohiro Ogawa	L	July 4, 1996 (age 30)	1.82 m (6 ft 0 in)	67 kg (148 lb)	312 cm (123 in)	290 cm (110 in)	(Poland) LKPS Lublin
14	Yūki Ishikawa (c)	OH	December 11, 1995 (age 30)	1.92 m (6 ft 4 in)	84 kg (185 lb)	351 cm (138 in)	327 cm (129 in)	(Turkey) Ziraat Bankkart
17	Keigo Nishimoto	MB	October 27, 1998 (age 27)	1.88 m (6 ft 2 in)	93 kg (205 lb)	355 cm (140 in)	325 cm (128 in)	(Japan) Hiroshima Thunders
20	Tomohiro Yamamoto	L	November 5, 1994 (age 31)	1.71 m (5 ft 7 in)	69 kg (152 lb)	301 cm (119 in)	299 cm (118 in)	(Japan) Osaka Bluteon
23	Larry Evbade-Dan	MB	August 18, 2000 (age 26)	1.95 m (6 ft 5 in)	81 kg (179 lb)	350 cm (140 in)	333 cm (131 in)	(Japan) Osaka Bluteon

2026 Asian Games

The following is the Japanese roster for the 2026 Asian Games (announced July 31, 2026).

Head coach: (France) Laurent Tillie

No.	Name	Pos.	Date of birth	Height	Weight	Spike	Block	2026–27 club
5	Tatsunori Otsuka	OH	November 5, 2000 (age 25)	1.95 m (6 ft 5 in)	90 kg (200 lb)	340 cm (130 in)	325 cm (128 in)	(Italy) Power Volley Milano
7	Yudai Arai (c)	OH	June 27, 1998 (age 28)	1.88 m (6 ft 2 in)	85 kg (187 lb)	352 cm (139 in)	320 cm (130 in)	(Japan) Hiroshima Thunders
9	Yudai Kawahigashi	S	February 7, 1998 (age 28)	1.75 m (5 ft 9 in)	72 kg (159 lb)	315 cm (124 in)	-	(Japan) JTEKT Stings
15	Masato Kai	OH	September 25, 2003 (age 23)	2.00 m (6 ft 7 in)	79 kg (174 lb)	352 cm (139 in)	330 cm (130 in)	(Japan) Osaka Bluteon
17	Keigo Nishimoto	MB	October 27, 1998 (age 27)	1.88 m (6 ft 2 in)	93 kg (205 lb)	355 cm (140 in)	325 cm (128 in)	(Japan) Hiroshima Thunders
18	Hiroto Nishiyama	OP	March 4, 2003 (age 23)	1.93 m (6 ft 4 in)	77 kg (170 lb)	355 cm (140 in)	330 cm (130 in)	(Japan) Osaka Bluteon
24	Keihan Takahashi	OP	October 13, 2003 (age 23)	1.94 m (6 ft 4 in)	83 kg (183 lb)	357 cm (141 in)	325 cm (128 in)	(Japan) JTEKT Stings
25	Ryo Shimokawa	S	January 12, 2000 (age 26)	1.78 m (5 ft 10 in)	65 kg (143 lb)	320 cm (130 in)	305 cm (120 in)	(Japan) Suntory Sunbirds
26	Rikuto Goto	OH	May 13, 2001 (age 25)	1.87 m (6 ft 2 in)	82 kg (181 lb)	345 cm (136 in)	320 cm (130 in)	(Japan) Tokyo Great Bears
28	Kento Asano	MB	December 24, 2004 (age 21)	2.07 m (6 ft 9 in)	93 kg (205 lb)	345 cm (136 in)	-	(Japan) Waseda University
30	Keitaro Nishikawa	MB	April 14, 2000 (age 26)	1.95 m (6 ft 5 in)	83 kg (183 lb)	350 cm (140 in)	-	(Japan) Osaka Bluteon
37	Kazuyuki Takahashi	L	January 26, 2000 (age 26)	1.70 m (5 ft 7 in)	62 kg (137 lb)	310 cm (120 in)	285 cm (112 in)	(Japan) JTEKT Stings

=== Former squads ===
2011
- 2011 Japan Men's national volleyball team roster
  Daisuke Usami (c), Yuta Abe, Naoya Suga, Shogo Okamoto, Shun Imamura, Takahiro Yamamoto, Yuya Ageba, Yusuke Ishijima, Yu Koshikawa, Yuta Yoneyama, Seima Kanda, Tatsuya Fukuzawa, Kunihiro Shimizu, Tatsuya Yoneyama, Daisuke Yako, Kota Yamamura, Takashi Dekita, Yamato Fushimi, Osamu Tanabe, Daisuke Sakai, Takeshi Nagano, Takeshi Kitajima, Kazuyoshi Yokota, and Masashi Kuriyama. Head Coach: Tatsuya Ueta.
2012
- 2012 Japan Men's national volleyball team roster
  Daisuke Sakai, Yuta Abe, Takeshi Nagano, Yusuke Matsuta, Daisuke Usami, Yoshifumi Suzuki, Takahiro Yamamoto, Yuya Ageba, Takaaki Tomimatsu, Osamu Tanabe, Yoshihiko Matsumoto, Kota Yamamura, Tatsuya Fukuzawa, Kunihiro Shimizu, Daisuke Yako, Yusuke Ishijima, Yu Koshikawa, Yuta Yoneyama, Akira Koshiya, Ayumu Shinoda, Shigeru Kondoh, Naoya Suga, Yuji Suzuki, Yuhei Tsukazaki, Dai Tezuka, Takashi Dekita and Kazuyoshi Yokota. Head Coach: Tatsuya Ueta.
2013
- 2013 Japan Men's national volleyball team roster
  Yuta Abe, Shigeru Kondoh, Takahisa Otake, Naoya Suga, Shogo Okamoto, Shun Imamura, Akihiro Fukatsu, Hideomi Fukatsu, Issei Maeda, Yusuke Ishijima, Yu Koshikawa, Yuta Yoneyama, Yasuyuki Shibakoya, Yuji Suzuki, Tatsuya Fukuzawa, Yuhei Tsukazaki, Kunihiro Shimizu, Tatsuya Yoneyama, Takuya Takamatsu, Masashi Kuriyama, Daisuke Yako, Dai Tezuka, Shunsuke Chijiki, Yuta Matsuoka, Yuki Hosokawa, Sogo Watanabe, Hidetomo Hoshino, Takashi Dekita, Shuzo Yamada, Masahiro Yanagida, Kota Yamamura, Yoshihiko Matsumoto, Yusuke Matsuta, Yoshifumi Suzuki, Kenji Shirasawa, Takaaki Tomimatsu, Kazuyoshi Yokota, Shogo Toimoto, Hirotaka Kon, Tatsuya Shiota, Takuya Yasunaga, Haku Ri, Yamato Fushimi, Takeshi Nagano, Koichiro Koga, Ken Takahashi and Taichiro Koga. Head Coach: Sato Gary.
2014
- 2014 Japan Men's national volleyball team roster
  Shinji Takahashi, Shohei Uchiyama, Hideomi Fukatsu, Sho Sagawa, Yu Koshikawa, Yuta Yoneyama, Tatsuya Fukuzawa, Kunihiro Shimizu, Masashi Kuriyama, Ryusuke Tsubakiyama, Daisuke Yako, Dai Tezuka, Shunsuke Chijiki, Naoya Shiraiwa, Sogo Watanabe, Masahiro Yanagida, Kentaro Takahashi, Yūki Ishikawa, Takaaki Tomimatsu, Shogo Toimoto, Hideoki Eto, Haku Ri, Takashi Dekita, Yamato Fushimi, Kentaro Hoshiya, Akihiro Yamauchi, Koichiro Koga, Takeshi Nagano and Satoshi Ide. Head coach: Masashi Nambu.
2015
- 2015 Japan Men's national volleyball team roster
  Yuta Abe, Shunsuke Inoue, Akihiro Fukatsu, Hideomi Fukatsu, Yuta Yoneyama, Kunihiro Shimizu (c), Masashi Kuriyama, Daisuke Yako, Shunsuke Chijiki, Yuta Matsuoka, Sogo Watanabe, Hiroaki Asano, Masahiro Yanagida, Kenya Fujinaka, Kentaro Takahashi, Yūki Ishikawa, Yuki Suzuki, Yoshifumi Suzuki, Takaaki Tomimatsu, Takashi Dekita, Kentaro Hoshiya, Yuichiro Komiya, Akihiro Yamauchi, Yasunari Kodama, Issei Otake, Taishi Onodera, Daisuke Sakai, Koichiro Koga, Takeshi Nagano and Taiki Tsuruda. Head coach: Masashi Nambu.
2016
- 2016 Japan Men's national volleyball team roster
  Shinji Takahashi, Akihiro Fukatsu, Hideomi Fukatsu, Masahiro Sekita, Yu Koshikawa, Yuta Yoneyama, Tatsuya Fukuzawa, Kunihiro Shimizu (c), Masashi Kuriyama, Daisuke Yako, Naoya Shiraiwa, Hidetomo Hoshino, Hiroaki Asano, Masahiro Yanagida, Kentaro Takahashi, Tsubasa Hisahara, Yūki Ishikawa, Yoshifumi Suzuki, Takaaki Tomimatsu, Ryota Denda, Takashi Dekita, Akihiro Yamauchi, Yasunari Kodama, Taishi Onodera, Daisuke Sakai, Koichiro Koga, Takeshi Nagano and Shunsuke Watanabe. Head coach: Masashi Nambu.
2017
- 2017 Japan Men's national volleyball team roster
  Akihiro Fukatsu, Hideomi Fukatsu (c), Naonobu Fujii, Masahiro Sekita, Yuta Yoneyama, Yuji Suzuki, Kunihiro Shimizu, Takuya Takamatsu, Masashi Kuriyama, Hiroaki Asano, Masahiro Yanagida, Shuzo Yamada, Naoya Takano, Takeshi Ogawa, Tsubasa Hisahara, Issei Otake, Yūki Ishikawa, Yuki Suzuki, Yudai Arai, Takaaki Tomimatsu, Haku Ri, Ryota Denda, Takashi Dekita, Akihiro Yamauchi, Kentaro Takahashi, Taishi Onodera, Taichiro Koga, Taiki Tsuruda, Satoshi Ide and Shohei Yamamoto. Head coach: Yuichi Nakagaichi.
2018
- 2018 Japan Men's national volleyball team roster
  Hideomi Fukatsu, Naonobu Fujii, Masahiro Sekita, Masaki Oya, Motoki Eiro, Tatsuya Fukuzawa, Takuya Takamatsu, Shunsuke Chijiki, Hiroaki Asano, Masahiro Yanagida (c), Naoya Takano, Tsubasa Hisahara, Yūki Ishikawa, Hiroki Ozawa, Jin Tsuzuki, Kunihiro Shimizu, Takashi Dekita, Takeshi Ogawa, Issei Otake, Yudai Arai, Yuji Nishida, Haku Ri, Ryota Denda, Yamato Fushimi, Akihiro Yamauchi, Kentaro Takahashi, Taishi Onodera, Hirohito Kashimura, Shinichiro Sato, Taichiro Koga, Satoshi Ide, Ryuta Homma, Wataru Inoue and Tomohiro Horie. Head coach: Yuichi Nakagaichi.
2019
- 2019 Japan Men's national volleyball team roster
  Akihiro Fukatsu, Hideomi Fukatsu, Naonobu Fujii, Masahiro Sekita, Tatsuya Fukuzawa, Masashi Kuriyama, Hiroaki Asano, Naoya Takano, Tsubasa Hisahara, Yūki Ishikawa, Yuki Higuchi, Jin Tsuzuki, Kunihiro Shimizu, Issei Otake, Yūji Nishida, Haku Ri, Takashi Dekita, Akihiro Yamauchi, Kentaro Takahashi, Taishi Onodera, Taichiro Koga, Masahiro Yanagida (c), Satoshi Ide and Tomohiro Yamamoto. Head coach: Yuichi Nakagaichi.
2020
- 2020 Japan Men's national volleyball team roster
  Kunihiro Shimizu, Taishi Onodera, Naonobu Fujii, Issei Otake, Tatsuya Fukuzawa, Akihiro Yamauchi, Tsubasa Hisahara, Masahiro Yanagida (c), Hideomi Fukatsu, Taichiro Koga, Yūji Nishida, Masahiro Sekita, Kenya Fujinaka, Yūki Ishikawa, Haku Lee, Kentaro Takahashi, Masaki Oya, Tomohiro Yamamoto, Yudai Arai, Ryuta Homma, Yutaro Takemoto, Kenta Takanashi, Yuki Higuchi, Shoma Tomita, Shunichiro Sato, Tatsunori Otsuka and Ran Takahashi. Head coach: Yuichi Nakagaichi.
2021
- 2021 Japan Men's national volleyball team roster
  Kunihiro Shimizu, Taishi Onodera, Naonobu Fujii, Issei Otake, Tatsuya Fukuzawa, Akihiro Yamauchi, Masahiro Yanagida, Hideomi Fukatsu, Taichiro Koga, Yūji Nishida, Masahiro Sekita, Masaki Oya, Yūki Ishikawa (c), Haku Lee, Kentaro Takahashi, Kenta Takanashi, Shoma Tomita, Tatsunori Otsuka, Tomohiro Yamamoto, Ran Takahashi, Taichi Fukuyama, Shunichiro Sato, Tomohiro Ogawa and Kento Miyaura. Head coach: Yuichi Nakagaichi.
2022
- 2022 Japan Men's national volleyball team roster
  Yuji Nishida, Taishi Onodera, Akihiro Fukatsu, Issei Otake, Tatsunori Otsuka, Akihiro Yamauchi, Kenta Takanashi, Masahiro Sekita, Masaki Oya, Kentaro Takahashi, Shoma Tomita, Ran Takahashi, Tomohiro Ogawa, Yūki Ishikawa (c), Haku Lee, Kento Miyaura, Akito Yamazaki, Kenyu Nakamoto, Takahiro Shin, Tomohiro Yamamoto, Motoki Eiro, Yuki Higuchi, Shunichiro Sato, Kazuyuki Takahashi, Shunsuke Nakamura, Go Murayama, Kenta Koga, Hiroki Ito, Soshi Fujinaka, Larry Ebade-Dan, Yuga Tarumi, Keitaro Nishikawa, Hiroaki Maki, Masato Kai, Kento Asano and Yuichiro Komiya. Head coach: Philippe Blain.
2023
- 2023 Japan Men's national volleyball team roster
  Yuji Nishida, Taishi Onodera, Akihiro Fukatsu, Kento Miyaura, Tatsunori Otsuka, Akihiro Yamauchi, Kenta Takanashi, Masahiro Sekita, Masaki Oya, Kentaro Takahashi, Shoma Tomita, Ran Takahashi, Tomohiro Ogawa, Yūki Ishikawa (c), Masahiro Yanagida, Go Murayama, Hiroki Ozawa, Hiroto Nishiyama, Satoshi Tsuiki, Tomohiro Yamamoto, Motoki Eiro, Kenya Fujinaka, Shunichiro Sato, Kazuyuki Takahashi, Takahiro NambaAkito Yamazaki, Soshi Fujinaka, Larry Ebade-Dan, Ryu Yamamoto, Masato Kai, Keihan Takahashi, Kento Asano, Kazuma Sonae, Yudai Arai, Hirohito Kashimura, Hiromasa Miwa, Ryo Shimokawa, Akira Sawada. Head coach: Philippe Blain.
2024
- 2024 Japan Men's national volleyball team roster
  Yuji Nishida, Taishi Onodera, Akihiro Fukatsu, Kento Miyaura, Tatsunori Otsuka, Akihiro Yamauchi, Kenta Takanashi, Masahiro Sekita, Masaki Oya, Kentaro Takahashi, Shoma Tomita, Ran Takahashi, Tomohiro Ogawa, Yūki Ishikawa (c), Masato Kai, Hiroto Nishiyama, Tomohiro Yamamoto, Larry Evbade-Dan. Head coach: Philippe Blain.
2025
- 2025 Japan Men's national volleyball team roster
  Yuji Nishida, Taishi Onodera, Hideomi Fukatsu, Kento Miyaura, Tatsunori Otsuka, Akihiro Yamauchi, Yudai Arai, Masahiro Sekita, Masaki Oya, Kentaro Takahashi, Shoma Tomita, Ran Takahashi, Tomohiro Ogawa, Yūki Ishikawa (c), Masato Kai, Go Murayama, Keigo Nishimoto, Hiroto Nishiyama, Kazuyuki Takahashi, Tomohiro Yamamoto, Motoki Eiro, Soshi Fujinaka, Larry Evbade-Dan, Keihan Takahashi, Ryo Shimokawa, Akito Yamazaki, Yuga Tarumi, Kento Asano, Hiromasa Miwa, Keitaro Nishikawa, Yuki Imahashi, Shunichiro Sato, Keishiro Takaki, Rikuto Goto, Yuji Kudo, Taito Mizumachi, Riku Ito, Daiki Yamada, Hiroaki Maki, Kaishu Takematsu, Takuma Kawano, Aiki Mori, Kosuke Yasui, Ryu Yamamoto. Head coach: Laurent Tillie.

=== Coach history ===
List from 1965 until now:

- (Japan) Yasutaka Matsudaira (1965–1972)
- (Japan) Tsutomu Koyama (1973–1976)
- (Japan) Yūzo Nakamura (1977–1980)
- (Japan) Naohiro Ikeda (1980–1984)
- (Japan) Masaru Saito (1984–1986)
- (Japan) Tsutomu Koyama (1986–1988)
- (Japan) Masayuki Minami (1989–1990)
- (Japan) Seiji Oko (1991–1995)
- (Japan) Shinichiro Tsujiai (1996–1997)
- (Japan) Futoshi Teramawari (1997–2000)
- (Japan) Mikiyasu Tanaka (2001–2004)
- (Japan) Tatsuya Ueta (2005–2013)
- (United States) Gary Sato (2013–2014)
- (Japan) Masashi Nambu (2014–2016)
- (Japan) Yuichi Nakagaichi (2016–2021)
- (France) Philippe Blain (2021–2024)
- (France) Laurent Tillie (2024–)

== Kit providers ==
The table below shows the history of kit providers for the Japan national volleyball team.

Period	Kit provider
2000–	Asics

=== Sponsorship ===
Primary sponsors include: main sponsors like Shiseido other sponsors: Japanet, Molten, All Nippon Airways, Suntory, JTEKT, Nisshin Steel, Nippon Life, Marudai, Mizuno, Meiji Seika, Descente, Mikasa and Hisamitsu Pharmaceutical.

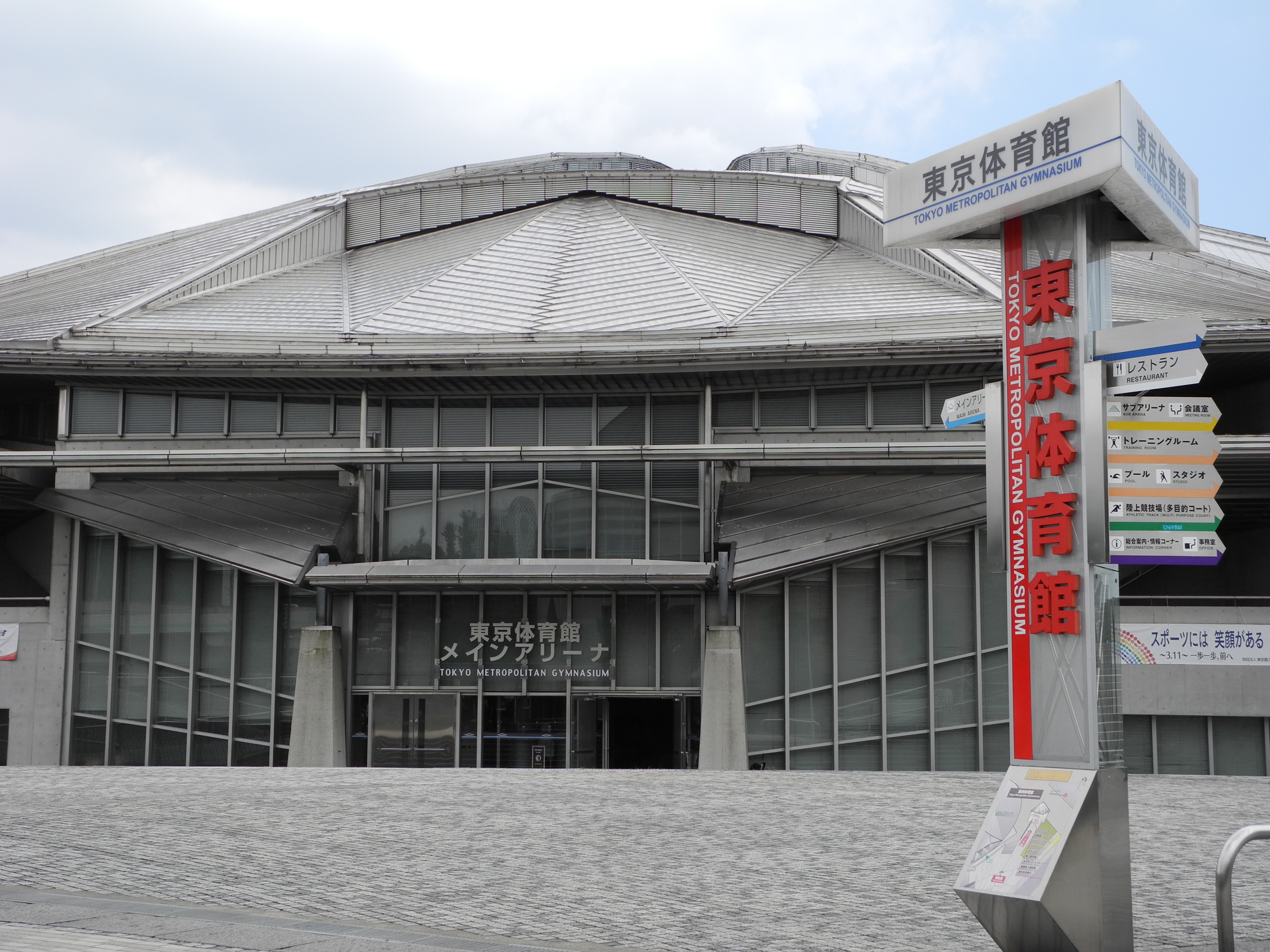
Tokyo Metropolitan Gymnasium

== Stadium ==
Tokyo Metropolitan Gymnasium and Yoyogi National Gymnasium Japan national team training and hosting venues.

== See also ==
- Volleyball
- Japan women's national volleyball team
- Japan men's national under-19 volleyball team
- Japan men's national under-21 volleyball team
