= Tatsuya Ueta =

Japanese volleyball player (born 1964)

Personal information
- Born: 25 July 1964 (age 62); Higashikagawa, Kagawa, Japan
- Height: 1.94 m (6 ft 4 in)

Volleyball information
- Position: Middle blocker
- Number: 7

National team
1985-1992	Japan
Honours
Men's volleyball
Representing Japan
Asian Games
Bronze medal – third place	1990 Beijing	Team

Tatsuya Ueta (植田 辰哉, Ueta Tatsuya; born 25 July 1964) is a Japanese former volleyball player who competed in the 1992 Summer Olympics.
