= Yuta Matsuoka =

Japanese volleyball player (born 1989)

Personal information
- Nationality: Japanese
- Born: 6 November 1989 (age 36) Minamiechizen, Fukui, Japan
- Height: 192 cm (6 ft 4 in)
- Weight: 72 kg (159 lb)
- Spike: 335 cm (132 in)
- Block: 325 cm (128 in)

Volleyball information
- Position: Outside hitter

Career
- Years: Team
- 2015–2020: (Japan) Sakai Blazers

National team
- Years: Team
- 2013, 2015: Japan

Yuta Matsuoka (松岡 祐太, Matsuoka Yūta; born 6 November 1989) is a retired Japanese male volleyball player. He used to be a part of the Japan men's national volleyball team. On club level, he played for Sakai Blazers.
