= Koichiro Koga =

Japanese volleyball player (born 1984)

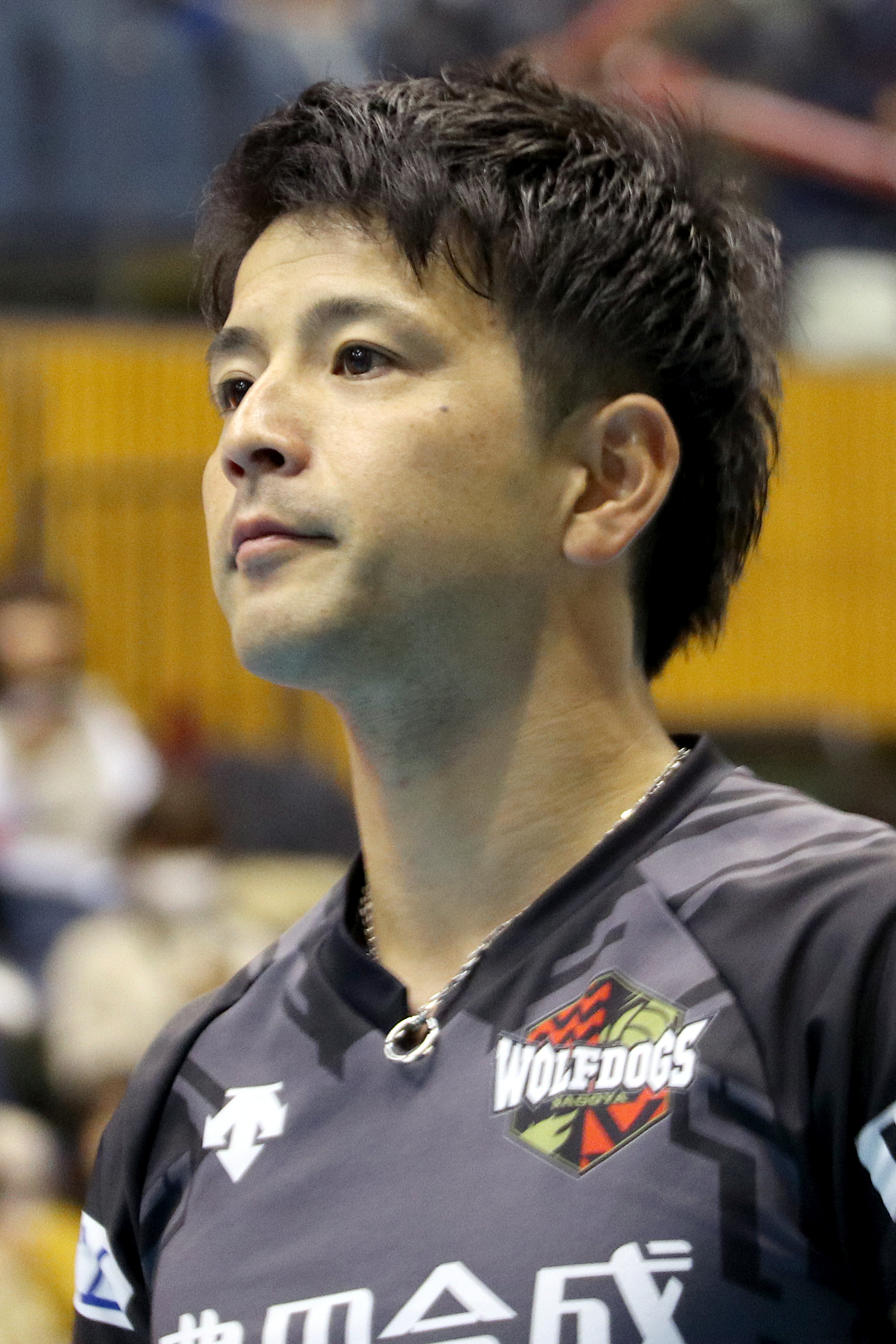

Personal information
- Nationality: Japanese
- Born: 30 August 1984 (age 42); Nagasaki, Japan
- Height: 171 cm (5 ft 7 in)
- Weight: 75 kg (165 lb)
- Spike: 310 cm (122 in)
- Block: 300 cm (118 in)

Volleyball information
- Position: Libero
- Current club: Retired

Career
Years	Teams
2007–2009	(Japan) Wolf Dogs Nagoya
2009–2021	(Japan) Toyoda Gosei Trefuerza

National team
2013–2016	Japan

Koichiro Koga (古賀 幸一郎, Koga Kōichirō; born 30 August 1984) is a retired Japanese male volleyball player. He was a part of the Japan men's national volleyball team. On club level, he played for Toyoda Gosei Trefuerza and then Wolf Dogs Nagoya.

His retirement was announced on March 7, 2021.

== Personal life ==
Koga has younger brother, Taichiro Koga, who is a part of Japan men's national volleyball team as the same position.
