= Masato Kai =

Japanese volleyball player (born 2003)

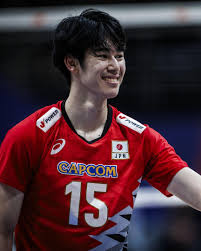

Personal information
- Full name: Masato Kai
- Nationality: Japanese
- Born: 25 September 2003 (age 23) Nobeoka City, Japan
- Education: Senshu University
- Height: 200 cm (6 ft 7 in)
- Weight: 79 kg (174 lb)
- Spike: 352 cm (139 in)
- Block: 330 cm (130 in)

Volleyball information
- Current club: (Japan) Osaka Bluteon
- Number: 15

Career
- Years: Team
- 2023–2024: (France) Paris Volley
- 2025–present: (Japan) Osaka Bluteon

National team
- Years: Team
- 2022–present: Japan men's national volleyball team
Medal record
Men's volleyball
Representing Japan
FIVB Nations League
Silver medal – second place	2024 Łódź	Team
Bronze medal – third place	2023 Gdańsk	Team
Asian Games
Silver medal – second place	2026 Aichi–Nagoya	Team
Asian Championship
Gold medal – first place	2023 Urmia	Team

Masato Kai (甲斐 優斗, Kai Masato; born 25 September 2003) is a Japanese male volleyball player and an Olympian. He plays as an outside hitter for the Japan men's national volleyball team and Osaka Bluteon.

== Personal life ==
Kai was born on 25 September 2003 in Nobeoka City, Miyazaki Prefecture, to Akihiro and Terumi Kai. He has an older brother, Koutarou, who plays for Suntory Sunbirds, and a younger sister named Sakura. He started playing volleyball in the second grade of elementary school at the Nobeoka Minami Volleyball Club, where his father was a coach.

In 2019, Kai attended the Miyazaki Prefectural Nichinan Shintoku High School and played an active role in the All Japan High School Volleyball Championship, leading the team to the semifinals in their first appearance at the tournament in his third-year. In 2022, he was accepted at Senshu University and currently majors in business administration.

== Career ==
At the age of 18, Kai was selected as one of the outside hitters for the first time when the Japan Volleyball Association (JVA) announced the Japan men's national volleyball team roster for the upcoming international competition.

In 2023, he participated in a friendly match with the Chinese national team and played an active role with his serves and spikes. After that, he was selected as one of 14 registered Japanese players for the Nagoya round in the first week of the FIVB Men's Volleyball Nations League, where he participated in the first round against Iran.

At the end of the university league, Kai arrived in France in December and played for Paris Volley at the recommendation of Philippe Blain, along with fellow national team member Kento Miyaura.

Later in 2024, Kai was chosen as one of 13 registered players to represent Japan at the 2024 Summer Olympics after qualifying for the first time in 16 years since the 2008 Summer Olympics through the traditional qualification tournament.

In December of the same year, he contributed to the first victory of Senshu University at the 2024 All Japan Intercollegiate Volleyball Championship. He won two individual awards: the Most Valuable Player (MVP) and Best Server. He was appointed as the next captain following the retirement of the fourth-year players from the team.

In January 2025, it was announced that Kai would be a special designated player for Osaka Bluteon. He made his SV League debut with a service ace in the 14th game of the 2024-2025 season against Hiroshima Thunders on February 1. From the beginning of the 2025-2026 season, he officially joined Osaka Bluteon and started in the opening game against Suntory Sunbirds on October 24.

At the 2025 All Japan Intercollegiate Volleyball Championship held in December, Captain Kai led Senshu University to the semi-finals in two consecutive years. The team placed 4th, and he was awarded Best Scorer and Best Server. In the same month, he became a silver medalist at the 2025 FIVB Volleyball Men’s Club World Championship and made history as a player of the first Japanese club to reach the world final.

== Awards ==
=== Club ===
- 2025 2025 FIVB Club World Championship, with Osaka Bluteon

=== National team ===
- 2023 Asian Championship
- 2023 FIVB Nations League
- 2024 FIVB Nations League

=== Individual ===
- 2022 All Japan High School Volleyball Championship – Best Middle Blocker
- 2024 Kanto University Men's Division Autumn League – Best Scorer and Best Server
- 2024 All Japan Intercollegiate Volleyball Championship – Most Valuable Player and Best Server
- 2025 All Japan Intercollegiate Volleyball Championship – Best Scorer and Best Server

== Clubs ==
- 2011–16 (Japan) Nobeoka Municipal Minami Elementary School
- 2016–19 (Japan) Nobeoka Municipal Minami Junior High School
- 2019–22 (Japan) Miyazaki Prefectural Nichinan Shintoku High School
- 2022–25 (Japan) Senshu University
- 2023–24 (France) Paris Volley
- 2025–present (Japan) Osaka Bluteon
