= Yuki Suzuki =

Japanese volleyball player (born 1997)

Personal information
- Nationality: Japanese
- Born: 29 May 1997 (age 29) Kitaakita, Akita, Japan
- Education: Tokai University
- Height: 201 cm (6 ft 7 in)
- Weight: 75 kg (165 lb)
- Spike: 340 cm (134 in)
- Block: 325 cm (128 in)

Volleyball information
- Position: Outside hitter
- Current club: (Japan) Panasonic Panthers
- Number: 11 (club)

Career
- Years: Team
- 2015: (Japan) Omonogawa High School
- 2015–2020: (Japan) Tokai University
- 2020–2023: (Japan) Panasonic Panthers

National team
- Years: Team
- 2015–2017: Japan

Yuki Suzuki (鈴木 祐貴, Suzuki Yūki; born 29 May 1997) is a Japanese male volleyball player. He was a part of the Japan men's national volleyball team. He used to play for Omonogawa High School and played for the Panasonic Panthers on the club level.

He announced his retirement from volleyball after the 2022/23 season.
