= Shunichiro Sato =

Japanese volleyball player (born 2000)

Shunichiro Sato 佐藤 駿一郎 (さとう しゅんいちろう)

Personal information
- Nationality: Japanese
- Born: May 17, 2000 (age 26); Miyagi, Japan
- Height: 204 cm (6 ft 8 in)
- Weight: 94 kg (207 lb)
- Education: Tokai University

Volleyball information
- Position: Middle Blocker
- Current club: Tokai University
- Number: National Team #23; University #2
Medal record
Men's volleyball
Representing Japan
Asian U23 Championship
Bronze medal – third place	2019 Naypyidaw	Team
FIVB U19 World Championship
Bronze medal – third place	2017 Bahrain	Team
Asian Youth Championship
Gold medal – first place	2017 Naypyidaw	Team

Shunichiro Sato (佐藤 駿一郎) is a Japanese male volleyball player. He currently plays in Tokai University and a member of Japan men's national volleyball team. He used to be part of Japan U21 & U19 national team.

== Career ==
Shunichiro Sato was first registered as member of Japan men's national volleyball team when he was senior student in high school in 2018.

Shunichiro Sato was a member of Japan men's national under-19 volleyball team to participate in 2017 Asian Boys' U19 Volleyball Championship and rewarded as Best Middle Blocker.

On 6 October 2022, JTEKT Stings announced Informal players for Season 2022–2023. Shunichiro Sato was on the list.

== National teams ==
- Japan men's national under-19 volleyball team (2017–2018)
  - 2017 Asian Boys' U19 Volleyball Championship - Champion
  - 2017 FIVB Volleyball Boys' U19 World Championship - 3rd place
- Japan men's national under-21 volleyball team (2017)
  - 2017 FIVB Volleyball Men's U21 World Championship- 13th place
  - 2018 Asian Men's U20 Volleyball Championship - 13th place
- Japan men's national under-23 volleyball team (2019)
  - 2019 Asian Men's U23 Volleyball Championship - 3rd place
- Japan universiade national team
  - 2019 Summer Universiade Tournament - 5th place
- Japan men's national volleyball team (2018, 2020–present)
  - 2018 Asian Games - 5th place

== Personal life ==
On 31 July 2026, Sato was given a suspended one-year prison sentence for by the Tokyo District Court for after he was caught with 0.831 g (0.0293 oz) of cannabis at a pachinko parlor in Tokyo on 27 May.

== Awards ==
=== Individual ===
- 2017 Asian Boys' U19 Volleyball Championship — Best Middle Blocker
