= Yoshifumi Suzuki =

Japanese volleyball player (born 1983)

Personal information
- Nationality: Japanese
- Born: 31 March 1983 (age 43) Kamakura, Kanagawa, Japan
- Height: 2.00 m (6 ft 7 in)
- Weight: 95 kg (209 lb)
- Spike: 340 cm (134 in)
- Block: 300 cm (118 in)

Volleyball information
- Position: Middle blocker

Career
- Years: Team
- 2005–2020: (Japan) Suntory Sunbirds

National team
- Years: Team
- 2010–2016: Japan

Yoshifumi Suzuki (鈴木 寛史, Suzuki Yoshifumi; born 31 March 1983) is a retired Japanese male volleyball player. He was part of the Japan men's national volleyball team at the 2010 FIVB Volleyball Men's World Championship in Italy. He played for only Suntory Sunbirds in the club level.

== Clubs ==
- (Japan) Suntory Sunbirds (2005–2020)
