= Hideomi Fukatsu =

Japanese volleyball player (born 1990)

Personal information
- Nationality: Japanese
- Born: 1 June 1990 (age 36); Aichi Prefecture, Japan
- Height: 180 cm (5 ft 11 in)
- Weight: 70 kg (154 lb)
- Spike: 330 cm (130 in)
- Block: 305 cm (120 in)

Volleyball information
- Current club: (Japan) Wolfdogs Nagoya
- Number: 2

Career
Years	Teams
2013–present	(Japan) Panasonic Panthers

National team
2014–2021	Japan

Hideomi Fukatsu (深津 英臣, Fukatsu Hideomi; born 1 June 1990) is a Japanese male volleyball player. With his club Panasonic Panthers he competed at the 2013 FIVB Volleyball Men's Club World Championship.
