= Takeshi Nagano =

Japanese volleyball player

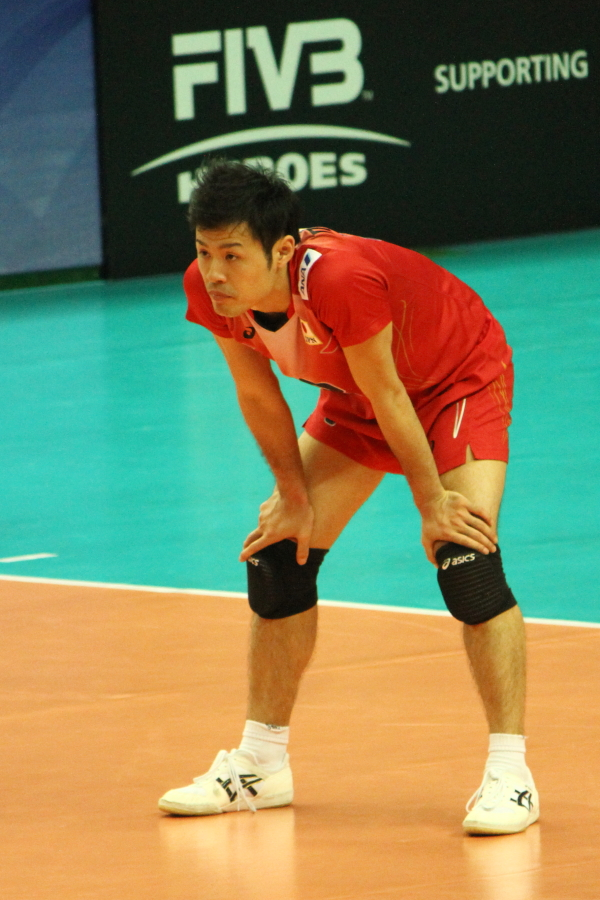

Personal information
- Full name: Takeshi Nagano
- Nickname: Takeshi
- Born: July 11, 1985 (age 41); Sasebo City, Nagasaki, Japan
- Height: 1.76 m (5 ft 9 in)
- Weight: 65 kg (143 lb)
- Spike: 315 cm (124 in)
- Block: 300 cm (120 in)
- Education: University of Tsukuba

Volleyball information
- Position: Libero
- Current club: (Japan) Panasonic Panthers
- Number: 17 (club)

National team
2009–2016	Japan
Medal record
Men's volleyball
Representing Japan
Asian Games
Gold medal – first place	2010 Guangzhou	Team
Silver medal – second place	2014 Incheon	Team
Asian Championship
Gold medal – first place	2009 Manila	Team

Takeshi Nagano (永野健, Nagano Takeshi; born July 11, 1985) is a Japanese volleyball player who plays for Panasonic Panthers.

== Clubs ==
- (Japan) Sasebo Minami High School
- (Japan) University of Tsukuba
- (Japan) Panasonic Panthers (2008–present)

== Awards ==
=== Individuals ===
- 2007-08 Men's V.Premier League – "Best Libero"
- 2008: 57th Kurowashi Tournament – "Best Libero"
- 2009-10 Men's V.Premier League – "Best Libero"
- 2010: 59th Kurowashi Tournament – "Best Libero"
- 2010-11 Men's V.Premier League – "Best Libero" and "Best Receiver"
- 2011-12 Men's V.Premier League – "Best Libero" and "Best Receiver"
- 2012-13 Men's V.Premier League – "Best Libero" and "Best Receiver"
- 2013: 62nd Kurowashi Tournament – "Best Libero"
- 2014: 63rd Kurowashi Tournament – "Best Libero"

=== Team ===
- 2008 Kurowashiki All Japan Volleyball Championship – Champion, with Panasonic Panthers.
- 2008-09 V.Premier League – 3rd place, with Panasonic Panthers.
- 2009 Kurowashiki All Japan Volleyball Championship – Champion, with Panasonic Panthers.
- 2009-10 V.Premier League – Champion, with Panasonic Panthers.
- 2010 Kurowashiki All Japan Volleyball Championship – Champion, with Panasonic Panthers.
- 2010 Asian Club Championship – 3rd place, with Panasonic Panthers.
- 2010-11 V.Premier League – 4th place, with Panasonic Panthers.
- 2011-12 V.Premier League – Champion, with Panasonic Panthers.
- 2012 Kurowashiki All Japan Volleyball Championship – Champion, with Panasonic Panthers.
- 2012-13 V.Premier League – Runner-Up, with Panasonic Panthers.
- 2013 Kurowashiki All Japan Volleyball Championship – Runner-Up, with Panasonic Panthers.
- 2013-14 V.Premier League – Runner-Up, with Panasonic Panthers.
- 2014 Kurowashiki All Japan Volleyball Championship – Champion, with Panasonic Panthers.

== National team ==
=== Senior team ===
- 2009 Asian Championship – Gold Medal
- 2010 World Championship – 13th place
- 2010 Asian Games – Gold Medal
- 2011 World Cup – 10th place
- 2011 Asian Championship – 5th place
- 2013 World Grand Champions Cup – 6th place
- 2013 World League – 18th place
- 2013 Asian Championship – 4th place
- 2014 World League – 19th place
- 2014 Asian Games – Silver Medal
