= Shunsuke Chijiki =

Japanese volleyball player (born 1989)

Personal information
- Nationality: Japanese
- Born: 6 September 1989 (age 37); Ibara, Okayama, Japan
- Height: 193 cm (6 ft 4 in)
- Weight: 83 kg (183 lb)
- Spike: 348 cm (137 in)
- Block: 330 cm (130 in)
- Education: Chuo University

Volleyball information
- Position: Outside hitter
- Current club: (Japan) Sakai Blazers
- Number: 10 (club)

Career
Years	Teams
2011–2022	(Japan) Sakai Blazers

National team
2015–2018	Japan

Shunsuke Chijiki (千々木 駿介, Chijiki Shunsuke; born 6 September 1989) is a Japanese male volleyball player. He was part of the Japan men's national volleyball team. On club level, he plays for Sakai Blazers. He announced retirement from volleyball player after the 2022 Kurowashiki All Japan Volleyball Tournament and become trainer of Sakai Blazers.
