= Takashi Dekita =

Japanese volleyball player (born 1991)

Personal information
- Nationality: Japanese
- Born: 13 August 1991 (age 35); Hokkaido, Japan
- Hometown: Sapporo
- Height: 199 cm (6 ft 6 in)
- Weight: 90 kg (198 lb)
- Spike: 350 cm (138 in)
- Block: 330 cm (130 in)
- Education: University of Tsukuba

Volleyball information
- Position: Middle Blocker / Opposite spiker
- Current club: (Japan) Sakai Blazers
- Number: 7 (club)

Career
Years	Teams
N/A	(Japan) Sapporo Daiichi High School
N/A	(Japan) University of Tsukuba
2014–present	(Japan) Sakai Blazers

National team
2015–2016	Japan

Takashi Dekita (出耒 田敬, Dekita Takashi; born 13 August 1991) is a Japanese volleyball player. He was a part of the Japan men's national volleyball team. On club level he plays for Sakai Blazers.
