= Masashi Kuriyama =

Japanese volleyball player (born 1988)

Personal information
- Nationality: Japanese
- Born: 14 July 1988 (age 38) Saga, Japan
- Height: 190 cm (6 ft 3 in)
- Weight: 83 kg (183 lb)
- Spike: 342 cm (135 in)
- Block: 330 cm (130 in)

Volleyball information
- Position: Outside hiiter
- Current club: (Japan) Suntory Sunbirds
- Number: 19 (Suntory Sunbirds)

Career
- Years: Team
- 2011–present: (Japan) Suntory Sunbirds

National team
- Years: Team
- 2013–2019: Japan

Masashi Kuriyama (栗山 雅史, Masashi Kuriyama; born 14 July 1988) is a Japanese male volleyball player. He was part of the Japan men's national volleyball team. On club level he plays for Suntory Sunbirds in V.League division 1.

On February 10, 2023, Suntory Sunbirds announced that Masasha Kuriyama was set to retire after the season 2022-2023. The retirement ceremony will be held on Match 18 2023.
