= Yamato Fushimi =

Japanese volleyball player (born 1991)

Personal information
- Full name: Yamato Fushimi
- Nickname: Yamato
- Nationality: Japanese
- Born: December 24, 1991 (age 34) Shizuoka City, Shizuoka, Japan
- Education: Juntendo University
- Height: 2.07 m (6 ft 9 in)
- Weight: 118 kg (260 lb)
- Spike: 345 cm (136 in)
- Block: 328 cm (129 in)

Volleyball information
- Position: Middle Blocker
- Current club: Wolf Dogs Nagoya
- Number: 4

National team
- Years: Team
- 2014–2019: Japan
Medal record
Men's volleyball
Representing Japan
Universiade
Bronze medal – third place	2013 Kazan	Team
Asian Games
Silver medal – second place	2014 Incheon	Team
Asian Junior Championship
Gold medal – first place	2010 Nakhon Pathom	Team

Yamato Fushimi (伏見 大和 Fushimi Yamato, born December 24, 1991) is a Japanese volleyball player. He used to play for Japan men's national volleyball team and currently plays for Wolf Dogs Nagoya in V.League Division 1.

== Awards ==
=== Club ===
- 2022–23 Japanese Championship, with Wolfdogs Nagoya

== Clubs ==
- (Japan) Toyota City Junior High School
- (Japan) Shimizu Commercial High School
- (Japan) Juntendo University
- (Japan) Toray Arrows (2014–2019)
- (Japan) JTEKT Stings (2019–2021)
- (Japan) Wolf Dogs Nagoya (2021–2023)

== National teams ==
=== Senior team ===
- 2014 World League – 19th place
- 2014 Asian Games – Silver Medal
- 2018 FIVB Volleyball Men's World Championship – 17th place
- 2019 FIVB Volleyball Men's World Cup – 4th place

=== Junior team ===
- 2010 Asian Junior Championship – Gold Medal
- 2011 U21 World Championship – 12th place

=== University Team ===
- 2013 Summer Universiade – Bronze Medal
