= Kentaro Takahashi =

Japanese volleyball player (born 1995)

Personal information
- Nationality: Japanese
- Born: 8 February 1995 (age 31); Yamagata, Japan
- Height: 203 cm (6 ft 8 in)
- Weight: 93 kg (205 lb)
- Spike: 355 cm (140 in)
- Block: 330 cm (130 in)
- Education: University of Tsukuba

Volleyball information
- Position: Middle blocker
- Current club: (Japan) JTEKT Stings
- Number: 10 (national); 2 (club)

Career
Years	Teams
N/A	(Japan) Yonezawa Chuo High School
2014–2016	(Japan) University of Tsukuba
2016–2024	(Japan) Toray Arrows
2024-	(Japan) JTEKT Stings

National team
2012–2013	Japan U-19 national team
2013	Japan U-21 national team
2014–present	Japan senior national team
Medal record
Men's volleyball
Representing Japan
FIVB Nations League
Silver medal – second place	2024 Łódź	Team
Bronze medal – third place	2023 Gdańsk	Team
Asian Youth Championship
Bronze medal – third place	2012 Tehran	Team
Asian Championship
Gold medal – first place	2017 Gresik	Team
Gold medal – first place	2023 Urmia	Team
Bronze medal – third place	2019 Tehran	Team
- Last updated: 27 August 2023

Kentaro Takahashi (高橋 健太郎, Takahashi Kentarō; born 8 February 1995) is a Japanese male volleyball player. He is part of the Japan men's national volleyball team. Currently, he plays in V.League division 1 for JTEKT Stings

== Personal life ==
His family consists of his father, Kazuhiko Takahashi, who used to play Baseball; his mother; an older sister; and a younger sister, who are Long jump athletes.

== Career ==
Kentaro used to play Baseball before and he aimed to be professional baseball player. But at 15 years old, he broke his elbow so he had to quit playing baseball. After that, he attended at Yonezawa Chuo High School, he started to play volleyball and had an initiation about his future career as a volleyball player.

In 2012, He had selected as a Japan men's national under-19 volleyball team for the first time and received the bronze medal from the 2012 Asian Youth Boys Volleyball Championship.

In 2014, Kentaro had registered in Japan men's national volleyball team for the first time and entered University of Tsukuba respectively. Then, he was dubbed by the then national team coach Masashi Nanbu as one of "NEXT4", the word that referred to 4 players who would be the future of Japanese men's national team, alongside Masahiro Yanagida, Yūki Ishikawa and Akihiro Yamauchi.

In 2016, Kentaro decided to join Toray Arrows volleyball club in V.League and started playing for the team in 2016–17 season.

Ahead of 2022 FIVB Volleyball Men's World Championship, he quit national team for family matter. He returned to the team in 2023. After the 2024 Paris Olympics, he announced his retirement from the national team.

== Individual Award ==
- 2021-2022 V.League Division 1 - Best Blocker
- 2021-2022 V.League Division 1 - Best 6
- 2021-2022 V.League Division 1 - Fair Play Award
- 2022–2023 V.League Division 1- Best Blocker
