= Taichirō Koga =

Japanese volleyball player (born 1989)

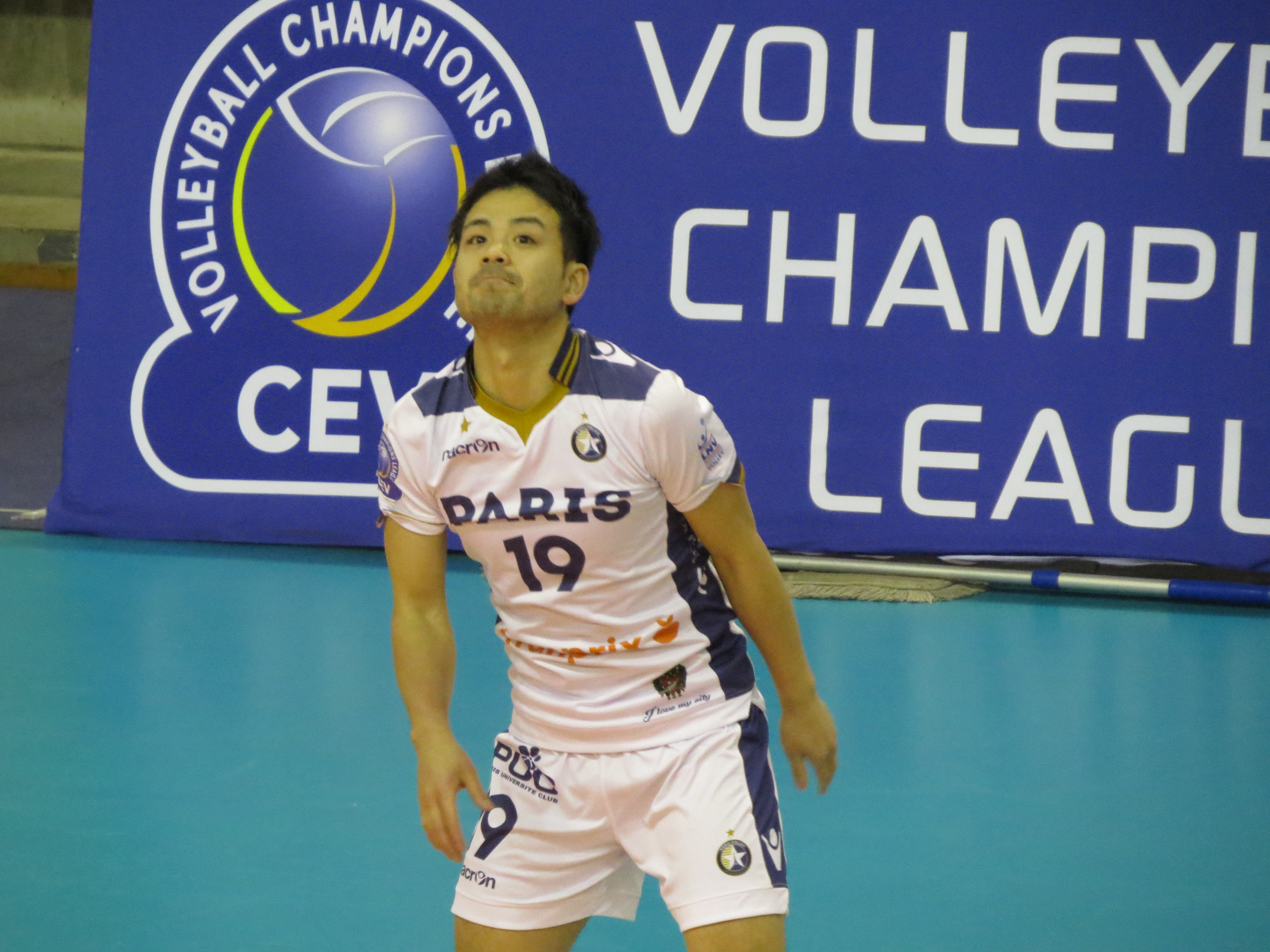

Personal information
- Nationality: Japanese
- Born: October 4, 1989 (age 37); Sasebo, Nagasaki
- Hometown: Sasebo, Nagasaki
- Height: 5 ft 7 in (1.7 m)
- Weight: 154 lb (70 kg)
- Spike: 115 in (292 cm)
- Education: International Budo University

Volleyball information
- Position: Libero

Career
Years	Teams
2012–2015; 2015–2016; 2016–2017; 2017–2020; 2020–2022; 2022–	(Japan) International Budo University (Japan) Toyoda Gosei Trefuerza (Finland) Kokkolan Tiikerit (France) Paris Volley (Poland) Aluron Virtu Warta Zawiercie (Japan) FC Tokyo (Japan) Tokyo Great Bears

National team
2015–2021	Japan
Medal record
Asian Championship
Gold medal – first place	2017 Gresik
Bronze medal – third place	2019 Tehran

Taichirō Koga (古賀 太一郎, Koga Taichirō; born October 4, 1989) is a Japanese volleyball player, a member of the Japan men's national volleyball team, a gold medalist of the 2017 Asian Championship.

== Sporting achievements ==
- National championships
  - 2014/2015 Japanese Championship, with Toyoda Gosei Trefuerza
  - 2015/2016 Finnish Cup, with Kokkolan Tiikerit
  - 2015/2016 Finnish Championship, with Kokkolan Tiikerit
- National team
  - 2012 Asian Cup
  - 2013 Summer Universiade
  - 2017 Asian Championship
  - 2019 Asian Championship

=== Individually ===
- 2016: Finnish Championship – The Most Valuable Player
