= Yasunari Kodama =

Japanese volleyball player (born 1994)

Personal information
- Nationality: Japanese
- Born: 24 July 1994 (age 32) Kagoshima, Kagoshima, Japan
- Education: University of Tsukuba
- Height: 192 cm (6 ft 4 in)
- Weight: 80 kg (176 lb)
- Spike: 336 cm (132 in)
- Block: 305 cm (120 in)

Volleyball information
- Position: Middle blocker
- Current club: Panasonic Panthers
- Number: 21

Career
- Years: Team
- 2015: University of Tsukuba
- 2016–present: Panasonic Panthers

National team
- Years: Team
- 2015–2016: Japan

Yasunari Kodama (born 24 July 1994) is a Japanese volleyball player. He was a part of the Japan men's national volleyball team. He used to play for University of Tsukuba, and currently plays for the Panasonic Panthers on the club level.
