= Daisuke Yako =

Japanese volleyball player (born 1988)

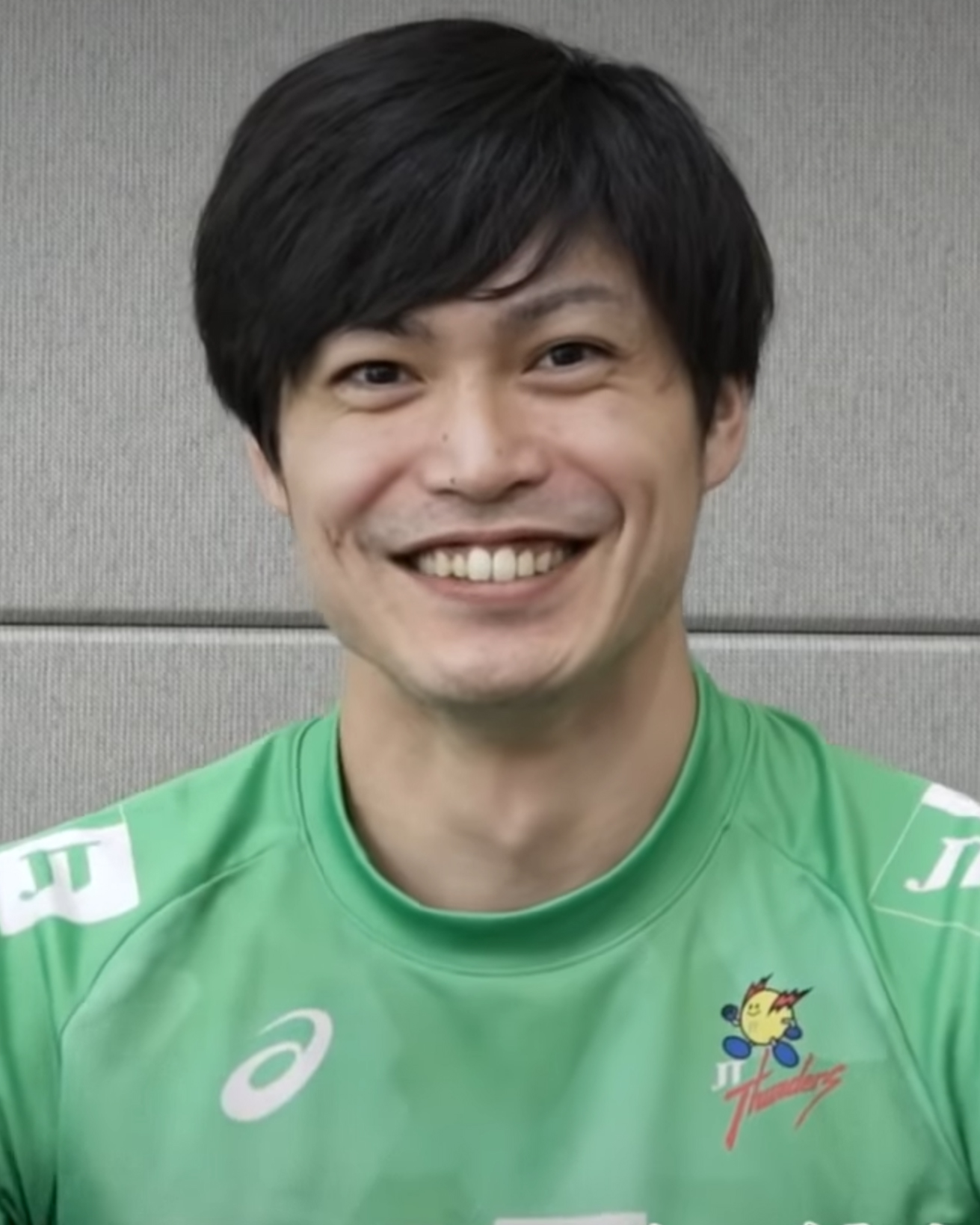
- Yako in 2018

Personal information
- Nationality: Japanese
- Born: 7 October 1988 (age 38); Koshigaya, Saitama, Japan
- Hometown: Hiroshima, Japan
- Height: 194 cm (6 ft 4 in)
- Weight: 89 kg (196 lb)
- Spike: 335 cm (132 in)
- Block: 325 cm (128 in)

Volleyball information
- Position: Outside hitter

Career
Years	Teams
2015–2021	(Japan) JT Thunders

National team
2007	Japan U-21 national team
2011–2016	Japan senior national team

Daisuke Yako (born 7 October 1988) is a retired Japanese male volleyball player. He was a part of the Japan men's national volleyball team. On club level, he only played for JT Thunders.
