= Sogo Watanabe =

Japanese volleyball player (born 1990)

Personal information
- Nationality: Japanese
- Born: 21 July 1990 (age 36); Aichi, Japan
- Height: 196 cm (6 ft 5 in)
- Weight: 83 kg (183 lb)
- Spike: 335 cm (132 in)
- Block: 320 cm (126 in)
- Education: Chuo University

Volleyball information
- Position: Outside hitter
- Current club: (Japan) Panasonic Panthers
- Number: 5

Career
| Years | Teams |
|---|---|
| N/A | (Japan) Seijoh High School |
| N/A | (Japan) Chuo University |
| 2013–present | (Japan) Panasonic Panthers |

National team
| 2013–2015 | Japan |

Sogo Watanabe (渡辺 奏吾, Watanabe Sōgo; born 21 July 1990) is a Japanese volleyball player whose position is wing spiker. With his club Panasonic Panthers, he competed at the 2013 FIVB Volleyball Men's Club World Championship.
