= Takaaki Tomimatsu =

Japanese volleyball player (born 1984)

Personal information
- Nationality: Japanese
- Born: 20 July 1984 (age 42); Osaki, Miyagi, Japan
- Height: 1.92 m (6 ft 4 in)
- Weight: 85 kg (187 lb)
- Spike: 350 cm (138 in)
- Block: 330 cm (130 in)

Volleyball information
- Position: Middle blocker
- Current club: (Japan) Toray Arrows
- Number: 1

Career
Years	Teams
2007–present	(Japan) Toray Arrows

National team
2010–2017	Japan

Takaaki Tomimatsu (富松 崇彰, Tomimatsu Takaaki; born 20 July 1984) is a Japanese male volleyball player. He was part of the Japan men's national volleyball team at the 2010 FIVB Volleyball Men's World Championship in Italy. He currently plays for Toray Arrows.

== Clubs ==
- Toray Arrows (2007-)
