= Yuichiro Komiya =

Japanese volleyball player (born 1992)

Personal information
- Full name: Yūichirō Komiya
- Nationality: Japanese
- Born: 16 November 1992 (age 33) Saitama Prefecture, Japan
- Height: 192 cm (6 ft 4 in)
- Weight: 83 kg (183 lb)
- Spike: 345 cm (136 in)
- Block: 315 cm (124 in)

Volleyball information
- Position: Middle Blocker
- Current club: (Japan) Panasonic Panthers
- Number: 36 (national); 22 (club)

Career
- Years: Team
- 2015–2018: (Japan) Toray Arrows
- 2018–present: (Japan) Panasonic Panthers

National team
- Years: Team
- 2015, 2022: Japan

Yuichiro Komiya (小宮 雄一郎, Komiya Yūichirō; born 16 November 1992) is a Japanese male volleyball player. He was a part of the Japan men's national volleyball team in 2015 and is registered again in 2022. On club level, he used to play for Toray Arrows and then transferred to Panasonic Panthers.
