= Tatsunori Otsuka =

Japanese volleyball player (born 2000)

Personal information
- Full name: Tatsunori Ōtsuka
- Nicknames: Tatsu, Tatchan
- Nationality: Japanese
- Born: 5 November 2000 (age 26) Osaka, Japan
- Education: Waseda University
- Height: 1.95 m (6 ft 5 in)
- Weight: 87 kg (192 lb)
- Spike: 340 cm (134 in)
- Block: 325 cm (128 in)

Volleyball information
- Position: Outside hitter
- Current club: (Italy) Power Volley Milano
- Number: 5 - (National); 15 - (Club)

National team
- Years: Team
- 2017–2019 2020–present: Japan U19–U23 national team Japan senior national team
Medal record
Men's volleyball
Representing Japan
FIVB Nations League
Silver medal – second place	2024 Łódź	Team
Bronze medal – third place	2023 Gdańsk	Team
Asian Games
Silver medal – second place	2026 Aichi–Nagoya	Team
Asian Championship
Gold medal – first place	2023 Urmia	Team
Silver medal – second place	2021 Chiba/Funabashi	Team
Asian U23 Championship
Bronze medal – third place	2019 Naypyidaw	Team
FIVB U19 World Championship
Bronze medal – third place	2017 Bahrain	Team
Asian Youth Championship
Gold medal – first place	2017 Naypyidaw	Team

Tatsunori Otsuka (大塚 達宣, Ōtsuka Tatsunori; born 5 November 2000) is a Japanese male volleyball player and Olympian from Hirakata city, Osaka. He plays for Power Volley Milano and the Japanese national team (Ryujin Nippon).

== Personal life ==
Otsuka has a younger sister.

== Career ==
Otsuka started to play volleyball at the 3rd year of elementary school by entering in Panasonic Panthers Junior club. Then, in the six grade, he attended at "JVA Men's and Women's Elite Academy Training Camp" held by Japan Volleyball Association, in order to find the future players for the national team. In 2017, he was called for Japan men's national under-19 volleyball team for the first time and then was called for U-21 and U-23, respectively. In 2020, Otsuka had the name in the senior national team for the first time and he was one of the outside hitters in 2020 Summer Olympics. In 2024, Otsuka signed with Allianz Milan and will play for the team in the 2024-2025 club season.

== Clubs ==
- (Japan) Panasonic Panthers Junior
- (Japan) Rakunan High School (2016–2018)
- (Japan) Waseda University (2019–2022)
- (Japan) Panasonic Panthers (2021–2024)
- (Italy) Power Volley Milano (2024-2025)

== Individual Award ==
- 2022: V.League Division 1 - Best newcomer award
- 2023: V.League Division 1 – Best SIX

== See also ==
- List of Waseda University people
