= Kento Miyaura =

Japanese male volleyball player

Personal information
- Full name: Kento Miyaura
- Nickname: Miyaken
- Nationality: Japanese
- Born: 22 February 1999 (age 27) Kumamoto, Japan
- Education: Waseda University
- Height: 1.90 m (6 ft 3 in)
- Weight: 87 kg (192 lb)
- Spike: 347 cm (137 in)
- Block: 320 cm (126 in)

Volleyball information
- Position: Opposite spiker
- Current club: (Japan) Wolfdogs Nagoya
- Number: 4 (national)

National team
- Years: Team
- 2017–2018: Japan U–19 team
- 2017: Japan U–21 team
- 2019: Japan U–23 team
- 2021–present: Japan senior national team
Medal record
Men's volleyball
Representing Japan
FIVB Nations League
Silver medal – second place	2024 Łódź	Team
Bronze medal – third place	2023 Gdańsk	Team
Asian Championship
Gold medal – first place	2023 Urmia	Team
Silver medal – second place	2021 Chiba/Funabashi	Team
Asian U23 Championship
Bronze medal – third place	2019 Naypyidaw	Team
FIVB U19 World Championship
Bronze medal – third place	2017 Bahrain	Team
Asian Cup
Bronze medal – third place	2018 Taipei	Team
Asian Youth Championship
Gold medal – first place	2017 Naypyidaw	Team

Kento Miyaura (宮浦 健人, born 22 February 1999) is a Japanese male volleyball player from Kumamoto City, on the island of Kyushu. Currently, he plays in the SV.League for Wolfdogs Nagoya.

Kento used to be the captain of Japan U-19 team and Waseda University's club.

== Career ==
=== Elementary ===
Miyaura started playing volleyball in the second grade of elementary school. He was slender and lacked power, so he didn't get the opportunity to participate in the game until the 4th grade, where he still played as a substitute and was told, "You are not an ace".

=== High School ===
He was asked to create a new junior-level club at Chinzei High School. At the time, there were just two players in the club, so they could not participate in any competitions, but he always practiced every day.

Then, in his senior high school years, he was bothered by an injury that forced him to leave the team. In his second year, he was assigned as captain of the team, but he often caused trouble for the team due to his lack of ability. That was a very hard time in his volleyball life, so he thought about quitting. As time passed, the hardships made him stronger. However, he and the team suffered from the 2016 Kumamoto earthquakes, which closed their training gym. After a month, they had to find a new training place, but the environment was not good. So, as a result, the team won the runner-up place at the All Japan high school volleyball championship.

=== College ===
After high school graduation, Miyaura joined Waseda University. He was called to the Japan men's national under-19 volleyball team for the first time and later became captain of the team. In his second year, he considered himself stronger in physical terms, so he started to do weight training and communicated with the team's staff about injury prevention. Furthermore, he also changed his serving style from float serve to jump serve, adding more effectiveness to the team. In the next year, he became a big player on the team. Miyaura was assigned to be a national representative at every junior level: the U-19 team and the U-21 team in 2017, the U-23 team, and the Universiade team in 2019, respectively.

In his final year in college, he was a captain and led the team to victory in the All Japan Intercollegiate Volleyball Championship, making Waseda University win this tournament five years consecutively. Then, in the 2020–21 season, he joined the JTEKT Stings in V.League 1.

=== Japan Men's National Team ===
==== Season 2021–22 ====
In 2021, he was called up for the senior national team for the first time, and his first competition as a senior is the 2021 Asian Men's Volleyball Championship. The Japanese team finished as runners-up; he scored a total of 76 points and received the Best Opposite Spiker award.

On October 15, he played his first full game in the V.League as part of the starting line-up against the JT Thunders, which JTEKT lost to in 4 sets with a 1–3 record. He became a key player for the team since he helped the team score and became the top scorer in almost every match.

On January 16, 2022, JTEKT was in 7th place, and after losing in straight 5 matches, Miyaura helped the team win against the Toray Arrows in 4 sets, with a 3–1 record at home. In this game, Miyaura became JTEkT's top scorer, recording 30 points, which later made him emotional.

JTEKT Stings ended up in 7th place in the league. Miyaura was in 5th place in the top scorers category, the 1st among Japanese, with 651 points after finishing the final stage.

==== Season 2022–23 ====
Miyaura was back as a member of the Japanese National Team and went to compete in the 2022 FIVB Volleyball Men's Nations League. In the first week of the league, Miyaura scored 20 points in total, as he played as a starter against the United States, which Japan later lost to. In almost the last match of the third week, Miyaura, as a starter, showed his abilities tallying 17 points in 15 attacks and 2 aces, which lead the team to a 4-set victory over Germany with a 1–3 record.

On August 2, it was announced that he would play for the Polish Club PSG Stal Nysa in the 2022–2023 season.

In Japan's match against France in the VNL 2023, Miyaura played as a substitute, helping the team with a come from behind 4-set win against France with a 3–1 record, where with his high success rate in attacks and strong serve, scored 13 points in 10 attacks, 1 block, and 2 service aces.

==== Season 2023–24 ====
On June 16, Paris Volley announced that Kento Miyaura would join the club for the 2023–2024 season.

==== Season 2024–25 ====
JTEKT Stings announced that Miyaura would return to join the team. In January 2025, he had sprained his left ankle in the match against Hiroshima Thunders. In of SV.League, Miyaura led the team to the final round and made the team get the second place in the season after being defeated Suntory Sunbirds in 2 matches.

==== Season 2025–26 ====
In May 2025, it was announced that he would join Wolfdogs Nagoya at the club level.

For the national team, Miyaura became the main opposite hitter and strength for the season, competing in 2025 VNL and 2025 World Championship.

== Clubs ==
- (Japan) Chinzei High School (2015–2018)
- (Japan) Waseda University (2017–2020)
- (Japan) JTEKT Stings (2020–2022)
- (Poland) PSG Stal Nysa (2022–2023)
- (France) Paris Volley (2023–2024)
- (Japan) JTEKT Stings (2024–2025)
- (Japan) Wolfdogs Nagoya (2025–present)

== National teams ==
- Japan men's national under-19 volleyball team (2017–2018)
  - 2017 Asian Boys' U19 Volleyball Championship
  - 2018 Asian Men's U20 Volleyball Championship
- Japan men's national under-21 volleyball team (2017)
  - 2017 FIVB Volleyball Men's U21 World Championship
- Japan men's national under-23 volleyball team (2019)
  - 2019 Asian Men's U23 Volleyball Championship
- Japan universiade national team
  - 2019 Summer Universiade Tournament
- Japan men's national volleyball team (2021–present)

== Awards ==
=== Individual ===
- 2017 Asian Boys' U19 Volleyball Championship — MVP
- 2020 All Japan Intercollegiate Volleyball Championship — MVP
- 2020 All Japan Intercollegiate Volleyball Championship — Best Server
- 2021 Asian Men's Volleyball Championship — Best Opposite Spiker
- 2021-2022 V.League Division 1 - Fair play award

=== Club teams ===
- 2020 All Japan Intercollegiate Volleyball Championship — Champion, with Waseda University
- 2020-21 the Japanese Emperor's Cup — Champion, with JTEKT Stings

== See also ==
- List of Waseda University people
- Autumn Kanto University League Match - 宮浦世代になってから初の公式戦！王者の貫禄見せつけ好スタートを切る at wasedasports.com (Japanese)
- MIYAURA HELPS JAPAN GRIND OUT WIN OVER THAILAND at asianvolleyball.net
- 早稲田主将・宮浦健人 4連覇がかかった未知数のインカレ「全てを出し尽くす」 at 4years.asahi.com
- 【バレー】男子日本代表・宮浦健人インタビュー「昨シーズンのアジア選手権に比べたらかなり成長をしていると思うので自信を持ってやりたい」 at Yahoo! Japan
- 「試合に出るには西田有志と勝負しないといけない」バレー宮浦健人（23歳）が覚悟の海外挑戦…控えめな性格に変化？早稲田時代から20キロ増 at Yahoo! Japan

Awards
Preceded by (Iran) Amir Ghafour; 2019	Best Opposite Spiker of Asian Men's Volleyball Championship; 2021	Succeeded by (Iran) Amin Esmaeilnezhad; 2023
