= Tomohiro Yamamoto (volleyball) =

Japanese volleyball player (born 1994)

Personal information
- Full name: Tomohiro Yamamoto
- Nationality: Japanese
- Born: 5 November 1994 (age 32) Ebetsu, Hokkaido, Japan
- Education: Nippon Sport Science University
- Height: 171 cm (5 ft 7 in)
- Weight: 69 kg (152 lb)
- Spike: 301 cm (119 in)
- Block: 285 cm (112 in)

Volleyball information
- Position: Libero
- Current club: (Japan) Panasonic Panthers
- Number: 20

National team
- Years: Team
- 2019–present: Japan
Medal record
Men's volleyball
Representing Japan
FIVB Nations League
Silver medal – second place	2024 Łódź	Team
Bronze medal – third place	2023 Gdańsk	Team
Asian Championship
Gold medal – first place	2023 Urmia	Team
Silver medal – second place	2021 Chiba/Funabashi	Team
Bronze medal – third place	2019 Tehran	Team
Asian Cup
Bronze medal – third place	2016 Nakhon Pathom	Team

Tomohiro Yamamoto (山本智大, Yamamoto Tomohiro; born 5 November 1994) is a Japanese national volleyball player from Ebetsu, Hokkaido. He plays in V.League division 1 for Panasonic Panthers.

== Clubs ==
- (Japan) Towa no Mori Sanai High School
- (Japan) Nippon Sport Science University
- (Japan) FC Tokyo (2017–2018)
- (Japan) Osaka Blazers Sakai (2018–2023)
- (Japan) Panasonic Panthers (2023–present)

== Awards ==
=== Individual ===
- 2019 Asian Men's Volleyball Championship — Best Libero
- 2024 FIVB Nations League – Best libero
- 2025 AVC Champions League – Best libero

Awards
Preceded by (South Korea) Oh Jae-seong	Best Libero of Asian Men's Championship; 2019	Succeeded by (Iran) Mohammad Reza Hazratpour
