= Taishi Onodera =

Japanese volleyball player (born 1996)

Personal information
- Full name: Taishi Onodera
- Nationality: Japanese
- Born: February 27, 1996 (age 30) Miyagi Prefecture, Japan
- Education: Tokai University
- Height: 2.07 m (6 ft 9 in)
- Weight: 98 kg (216 lb)
- Spike: 346 cm (136 in)
- Block: 323 cm (127 in)

Volleyball information
- Position: Middle Blocker
- Current club: (Japan) Suntory Sunbirds
- Number: 2

National team
- Years: Team
- 2012–2013: Japan U-19 national team
- 2015: Japan U-21 national team
- 2017: Japan U-23 national team
- 2018–present: Japan senior national team
Medal record
Men's volleyball
Representing Japan
Nations League
Silver medal – second place	2024 Łódź	Team
Bronze medal – third place	2023 Gdańsk	Team
Asian Championship
Gold medal – first place	2023 Urmia	Team
Gold medal – first place	2026 Kitakyushu	Team
Silver medal – second place	2021 Chiba/Funabashi	Team
Bronze medal – third place	2019 Tehran	Team
Asian Youth Championship
Bronze medal – third place	2012 Tehran	Team
Asian U23 Championship
Silver medal – second place	2017 Ardabil	Team
Asian Cup
Bronze medal – third place	2016 Nakhon Pathom	Team

Taishi Onodera (小野寺 太志, Ōnodera Taishi; born 27 February 1996) is a Japanese male professional volleyball player who plays as a middle blocker for SV League club Suntory Sunbirds, which he captains, and the Japan national team.

== Clubs ==
- (Japan) Tohoku High School (2011–2014)
- (Japan) Tokai University (2014–2018)
- (Japan) JT Thunders Hiroshima (2018–2023)
- (Japan) Suntory Sunbirds (2023–Present)

== Awards ==
V.League Division One

- Season 2018-19: Best 6
- Season 2019-20: Best Blocker, Best Spiker, Best 6
- Season 2020-21: Best Blocker, Best 6
- Season 2021-22: Fair play award

National Team

- 2023 Asian Championship – Best middle blocker

== Personal life ==
Onodera is from Natori City, Miyagi Prefecture.

He made an official announcement on his social media account on April 3, 2022, that he and his long-term girlfriend were getting married. He revealed on social media that his wife had given birth to their first child, a son, on September 26, 2022.
