= Akihiro Yamauchi =

Japanese volleyball player (born 1993)

Personal information
- Nationality: Japanese
- Born: 30 November 1993 (age 32) Aichi, Japan
- Home town: Aichi
- Education: Aichi Gakuin University
- Height: 204 cm (6 ft 8 in)
- Weight: 85 kg (187 lb)
- Spike: 350 cm (138 in)
- Block: 335 cm (132 in)

Volleyball information
- Position: Middle Blocker
- Current club: (Japan) Panasonic Panthers
- Number: 6 (National Team); 10 (Panasonic Panthers)

Career
- Years: Team
- N/A: (Japan) Aichi Gakuin University
- 2016–present: (Japan) Panasonic Panthers

National team
- Years: Team
- 2014–present: Japan
Medal record
Men's volleyball
Representing Japan
FIVB Nations League
| Silver medal – second place | 2024 Łódź | Team |
| Bronze medal – third place | 2023 Gdańsk | Team |
Asian Games
| Silver medal – second place | 2014 Incheon | Team |
Asian Championship
| Gold medal – first place | 2015 Tehran | Team |
| Gold medal – first place | 2017 Gresik | Team |
| Gold medal – first place | 2023 Urmia | Team |
| Silver medal – second place | 2021 Chiba/Funabashi | Team |
| Bronze medal – third place | 2019 Tehran | Team |

Akihiro Yamauchi (山内 晶大, Yamauchi Akihiro) (born 30 November 1993) is a Japanese male volleyball player. He is part of the Japan men's national volleyball team. On a college club level he played for Aichi Gakuin University. He is captain of the Panasonic Panthers team, with the jersey number 10.

== Personal life ==
It was announced on 14 April 2019 that he got married in December 2018.

== Individual award ==
- 2023: V.League Division 1 – Best SIX
