= 2025–26 SV.League Men's =

Japanese volleyball league

2025-26 SV.League Men's
- Sport: Volleyball
- Duration: October 24, 2025 - May 17, 2026
- Teams: 10
- League champions: Osaka Bluteon
- Runners-up: Suntory Sunbirds Osaka
- Finals venue: Yokohama Arena, Kanagawa

Seasons
- 2024-25 2026-27

The 2025-26 SV.League Men's is the second tournament of the SV.League which scheduled from October 24, 2025 to May 17, 2026.

Osaka Bluteon beats Suntory Sunbirds Osaka in the 3rd final match to claim their first championship title. Yuji Nishida was named the Championship MVP while Dmitry Musersky was awarded Regular Season MVP.

== Clubs ==
2025-26 SV.League Men's
Club	Head Coach	Captain	City, Prefecture	Colors	Affiliation
Voreas Hokkaido	(Croatia) Edo Klein	(Japan) Kota Ikeda	Asahikawa, Hokkaido		Voreas
Tokyo Great Bears	(Finland) Kasper Vuorinen	(Japan) Taichiro Koga	Koto, Tokyo		Nature Lab
VC Nagano Tridents	(Japan) Shinji Kawamura	(Japan) Koga Iida	Takamori, Nagano		VC Nagano Create Sports
Toray Arrows Shizuoka	(Japan) Yuta Abe	(Japan) Yuto Fujinaka	Mishima, Shizuoka		Toray Industries
JTEKT Stings Aichi	(Japan) Shimbo Koichiro	(Japan) Kazuyuki Takahashi	Kariya, Aichi		JTEKT Corporation
Wolfdogs Nagoya	(Italy) Valerio Baldovin	(Japan) Kenta Ichikawa	Inazawa, Aichi		Toyoda Gosei
Osaka Bluteon	(Finland) Tuomas Sammelvuo	(Japan) Yuji Nishida	Hirakata, Osaka		Panasonic Corporation
Suntory Sunbirds Osaka	(France) Olivier Lecat	(Japan) Ran Takahashi	Minoh, Osaka		Suntory Holdings
Nippon Steel Sakai Blazers	(Japan) Takeshi Kitajima	(Japan) Yutaro Takemoto	Sakai, Osaka		Nippon Steel Corporation
Hiroshima Thunders	(Argentina) Carlos Javier Weber	(Japan) Yudai Arai	Hiroshima, Hiroshima		Japan Tobacco

== Transfer players ==
2025–26 SV.League Men's Inbound Transfers
Player	Coming from	Coming to	Ref.
(Estonia) Märt Tammearu	(Ukraine) Barkom-Każany Lwów	(Japan) Voreas Hokkaido	
(Japan) Taisei Deguchi	(Japan) Hokkaido Yellow Stars	(Japan) Voreas Hokkaido	
(Japan) Shota Hamada	(South Korea) Busan OK Savings Bank OKman	(Japan) Voreas Hokkaido	
(Japan) Hikaru Someno	(Japan) Suntory Sunbirds Osaka	(Japan) Voreas Hokkaido	
(Japan) Takumi Kunikyo	(Japan) Nihon University	(Japan) Voreas Hokkaido	
(Japan) Hyuga Matsushita	(Japan) Hokusho University	(Japan) Voreas Hokkaido	
(Japan) Youse Sakiyama	(Japan) Shuri High School	(Japan) Voreas Hokkaido	
(Japan) Go Murayama	(Japan) JTEKT Stings Aichi	(Japan) Tokyo Great Bears	
(Slovenia) Jan Kozamernik	(Italy) Itas Trentino	(Japan) Tokyo Great Bears	
(Argentina) Luciano Vicentín	(Poland) Jastrzębski Węgiel	(Japan) Tokyo Great Bears	
(Japan) Wataru Taniguchi	(Greece) AONS Milon	(Japan) Tokyo Great Bears	
(Poland) Bartosz Kurek	(Poland) ZAKSA Kędzierzyn-Koźle	(Japan) Tokyo Great Bears	
(Japan) Yusaku Takashima	(Japan) Nihon University	(Japan) Tokyo Great Bears	
(Japan) Ranmaru Kondo	(Japan) Meiji University	(Japan) Tokyo Great Bears	
(Japan) Yoshihiko Matsumoto	(Japan) Nippon Steel Sakai Blazers	(Japan) VC Nagano Tridents	
(Japan) Shinjo Akahoshi	(Japan) Hokkaido Yellow Stars	(Japan) VC Nagano Tridents	
(Canada) Matthew Neaves	(Germany) SWD Powervolleys Düren	(Japan) VC Nagano Tridents	
(Denmark) Oskar Kjerstein Madsen	(Czech Republic) VK Lvi Praha	(Japan) VC Nagano Tridents	
(Indonesia) Farhan Halim	(Indonesia) Jakarta Bhayangkara Presisi	(Japan) VC Nagano Tridents	
(Japan) Yusuke Hoshina	(Japan) Chiba DOT	(Japan) VC Nagano Tridents	
(Japan) Kanze Chiba	(Japan) Senshu University	(Japan) VC Nagano Tridents	
(Japan) Keiichiro Fujisawa	(Japan) Tokyo Gakugei University	(Japan) VC Nagano Tridents	
(Japan) Tomoya Ishizaka	(Japan) Juntendo University	(Japan) VC Nagano Tridents	
(Russia) Kirill Klets	(Russia) Zenit Kazan	(Japan) Toray Arrows Shizuoka	
(United States) Taylor Averill	(Italy) MINT Vero Volley Monza	(Japan) Toray Arrows Shizuoka	
(Cuba) Julio César Cárdenas	(Turkey) Bursa Büyükşehir Belediyespor	(Japan) Toray Arrows Shizuoka	
(Japan) Takumi Mawatari	(Japan) Fukuoka University	(Japan) Toray Arrows Shizuoka	
(Japan) Hiroaki Maki	(Japan) University of Tsukuba	(Japan) Toray Arrows Shizuoka	
(Japan) Shuto Kawaguchi	(Japan) Hiroshima Thunders	(Japan) JTEKT Stings Aichi	
(Japan) Issei Maeda	(Japan) Hiroshima Thunders	(Japan) JTEKT Stings Aichi	
(France) Stephen Boyer	(Poland) Asseco Resovia Rzeszów	(Japan) JTEKT Stings Aichi	
(Japan) Kenya Fujinaka	(Japan) Suntory Sunbirds Osaka	(Japan) JTEKT Stings Aichi	
(Chinese Taipei) Yao-Kai Lu Chiang	(Taiwan) Taichung Win Streak	(Japan) JTEKT Stings Aichi	
(Japan) Mitsuki Demizu	(Japan) Osaka University of Health and Sport Sciences	(Japan) JTEKT Stings Aichi	
(Japan) Kento Miyaura	(Japan) JTEKT Stings Aichi	(Japan) Wolfdogs Nagoya	
(Japan) Shunichiro Sato	(Finland) Hurrikaani Loimaa	(Japan) Wolfdogs Nagoya	
(Japan) Shinnosuke Hayasaka	(Japan) VC Nagano Tridents	(Japan) Wolfdogs Nagoya	
(Poland) Norbert Huber	(Poland) Jastrzębski Węgiel	(Japan) Wolfdogs Nagoya	
(France) Timothée Carle	(Poland) Jastrzębski Węgiel	(Japan) Wolfdogs Nagoya	
(France) Aymen Bouguerra	(Poland) GKS Katowice	(Japan) Wolfdogs Nagoya	
(Japan) Ryogo Maeda	(Japan) Waseda University	(Japan) Wolfdogs Nagoya	
(France) Antoine Brizard	(Italy) Gas Sales Bluenergy Piacenza	(Japan) Osaka Bluteon	
(China) Shikun Peng	(France) Paris Volley	(Japan) Osaka Bluteon	
(Philippines) Bryan Bagunas	(Philippines) Cignal HD Spikers	(Japan) Osaka Bluteon	
(Japan) Ryo Nozoe	(Japan) Daito Bunka University	(Japan) Osaka Bluteon	
(Japan) Masahiro Sekita	(Japan) JTEKT Stings Aichi	(Japan) Suntory Sunbirds Osaka	
(Japan) Tomohiro Ogawa	(Japan) JTEKT Stings Aichi	(Japan) Suntory Sunbirds Osaka	
(Russia) Egor Kliuka	(Russia) Zenit St. Petersburg	(Japan) Suntory Sunbirds Osaka	
(Japan) Kenta Takanashi	(Japan) Wolfdogs Nagoya	(Japan) Nippon Steel Sakai Blazers	
(Japan) Masaki Oya	(Japan) Suntory Sunbirds Osaka	(Japan) Nippon Steel Sakai Blazers	
(Italy) Tommaso Rinaldi	(Italy) Valsa Group Modena	(Japan) Nippon Steel Sakai Blazers	
(Denmark) Ulrik Bo Dahl	(Japan) VC Nagano Tridents	(Japan) Nippon Steel Sakai Blazers	
(United States) Matthew Anderson	(Turkey) Ziraat Bankkart	(Japan) Nippon Steel Sakai Blazers	
(Japan) Tatsuki Minamiguchi	(Japan) Tokai University	(Japan) Nippon Steel Sakai Blazers	
(Japan) Yuki Higuchi	(Japan) VC Nagano Tridents	(Japan) Hiroshima Thunders	
(Japan) Keigo Nishimoto	(Japan) Toray Arrows Shizuoka	(Japan) Hiroshima Thunders	
(Japan) Motoki Eiro	(Japan) Osaka Bluteon	(Japan) Hiroshima Thunders	
(United States) Cooper Robinson	(United States) UCLA	(Japan) Hiroshima Thunders	
(Cuba) Daniel Martínez Campos	(Brazil) Sada Cruzeiro	(Japan) Hiroshima Thunders	
(Japan) Hayato Yamamoto	(Japan) NSSU	(Japan) Hiroshima Thunders	

== Schedule ==
=== Regular season ===
The season began on Friday, October 24, 2025, and ended on Sunday, April 19, 2026.

1. Each club will play a total of 44 matches in a home-and-away format, with 22 of those matches being home games.
2. The top 6 clubs from the regular season will advance to the Championship.
3. The final standings for the clubs ranked 7th to 10th will be determined based on the results of the regular season.
4. All matches will be played as best-of-five sets.

=== Championship ===
The season began on May 1, 2026, and ended on May 17, 2026.

1. The Championship will be conducted in a tournament format.
2. The clubs ranked 3rd to 6th at the end of the regular season will compete in the Quarterfinals. The winners of the Quarterfinals will advance to the Semifinals.
3. The top two clubs from the regular season, along with the winners of the Quarterfinals, will compete in the Semifinals. The winners of the Semifinals will advance to the Finals.
4. There will be no ranking matches for the clubs that lose in the Quarterfinals and Semifinals, and the final rankings for the clubs placed 3rd to 6th will be determined based on their final standings in the regular season.
5. All matches, except for the Final, will be hosted by the higher-ranked club from the regular season.
6. All matches will be played as best-of-five sets.

Source: SV.League - Schedule

== Season standing procedure ==
=== Regular season ===
Points awarded per match are as follows:

- 3 Points: Win with a set score of "3-0" or "3-1"
- 2 Points: Win with a set score of "3-2"
- 1 Point: Loss with a set score of "2-3"
- 0 Points: Loss with a set score of "0-3" or "1-3"

=== Championship ===
A best-of-three format will be used, with the team winning two out of three matches advancing.

If both teams have one win each, a third match will be played to determine the winner.

Source: SV.League - Regulation

== Regular round ==
Qualified for the Final

2025–26 SV.League Men's Regular Round Final Standing
Rank	Team	Match	Win	Loss	Point	Win Ratio	Win Set	Loss Set	Set Rates
1	Suntory Sunbirds Osaka	44	40	4	117	0.91	122	31	3.94
2	Osaka Bluteon	44	38	6	109	0.86	120	42	2.86
3	JTEKT Stings Aichi	44	29	15	80	0.66	97	73	1.33
4	Wolfdogs Nagoya	44	25	19	75	0.57	96	74	1.30
5	Hiroshima Thunders	44	21	23	67	0.48	80	77	1.04
6	Tokyo Great Bears	44	21	23	67	0.48	85	88	0.97
7	Nippon Steel Sakai Blazers	44	17	27	51	0.39	72	95	0.76
8	Toray Arrows Shizuoka	44	13	31	38	0.30	59	110	0.54
9	Voreas Hokkaido	44	11	33	35	0.25	52	109	0.48
10	VC Nagano Tridents	44	5	39	22	0.11	36	120	0.30

Source: SV.League Men's - Standings

== Final round ==
- All times are Japan Standard Time (UTC+09:00).

Quarterfinals
01 May
JTEKT Stings Aichi	3
Tokyo Great Bears	0
02 May
JTEKT Stings Aichi	3
Tokyo Great Bears	0
01 May
Wolfdogs Nagoya	3
Hiroshima Thunders	0
02 May
Wolfdogs Nagoya	3
Hiroshima Thunders	2

Semifinals
09-10 May
Osaka Bluteon	2
JTEKT Stings Aichi	0
09-10 May
Suntory Sunbirds Osaka	2
Wolfdogs Nagoya	0

Final
15-17 May
Osaka Bluteon	2
Suntory Sunbirds Osaka	1

=== Quarterfinals ===
01 May 2026; 18:05	JTEKT Stings Aichi	3-0	Tokyo Great Bears	Okazaki Central Park Gymnasium, Aichi
01 May 2026; 18:05	25-21, 25-22, 25-20; Report			Okazaki Central Park Gymnasium, Aichi

01 May 2026; 18:05	Wolfdogs Nagoya	3-0	Hiroshima Thunders	Entrio, Aichi
01 May 2026; 18:05	25-17, 25-21, 26-24; Report			Entrio, Aichi

02 May 2026; 15:05	Wolfdogs Nagoya	3-2	Hiroshima Thunders	Entrio, Aichi
02 May 2026; 15:05	23-25, 26-24, 20-25, 25-22, 16-14; Report			Entrio, Aichi

02 May 2026; 16:11	JTEKT Stings Aichi	3-0	Tokyo Great Bears	Okazaki Central Park Gymnasium, Aichi
02 May 2026; 16:11	25-18, 25-19, 25-20; Report			Okazaki Central Park Gymnasium, Aichi

=== Semifinals ===
09 May 2026; 13:05	Suntory Sunbirds Osaka	3-0	Wolfdogs Nagoya	Asue Arena Osaka, Osaka
09 May 2026; 13:05	25-12, 25-22, 25-18; Report			Asue Arena Osaka, Osaka

09 May 2026; 18:05	Osaka Bluteon	3-0	JTEKT Stings Aichi	Asue Arena Osaka, Osaka
09 May 2026; 18:05	25-19, 25-19, 25-22; Report			Asue Arena Osaka, Osaka

10 May 2026; 13:05	Suntory Sunbirds Osaka	3-1	Wolfdogs Nagoya	Asue Arena Osaka, Osaka
10 May 2026; 13:05	23-25, 31-29, 25-20, 25-23; Report			Asue Arena Osaka, Osaka

10 May 2026; 18:05	Osaka Bluteon	3-1	JTEKT Stings Aichi	Asue Arena Osaka, Osaka
10 May 2026; 18:05	25-23, 25-22,20-25, 25-22; Report			Asue Arena Osaka, Osaka

=== Final ===
15 May 2026; 19:02	Suntory Sunbirds Osaka	3-1	Osaka Bluteon	Yokohama Arena, Kanagawa
15 May 2026; 19:02	26-24, 22-25, 25-16, 25-23; Report			Yokohama Arena, Kanagawa

16 May 2026; 16:05	Suntory Sunbirds Osaka	2-3	Osaka Bluteon	Yokohama Arena, Kanagawa
16 May 2026; 16:05	25-13, 23-25, 22-25, 25-20, 9-15; Report			Yokohama Arena, Kanagawa

17 May 2026; 15:35	Suntory Sunbirds Osaka	0-3	Osaka Bluteon	Yokohama Arena, Kanagawa
17 May 2026; 15:35	22-25, 20-25, 18-25; Report			Yokohama Arena, Kanagawa

== Final ranking ==
Rank	Club
1st place, gold medalist(s)	Osaka Bluteon
2nd place, silver medalist(s)	Suntory Sunbirds Osaka
3rd place, bronze medalist(s)	JTEKT Stings Aichi
4	Wolfdogs Nagoya
5	Hiroshima Thunders
6	Tokyo Great Bears
7	Nippon Steel Sakai Blazers
8	Toray Arrows Shizuoka
9	Voreas Hokkaido
10	VC Nagano Tridents

2025–26 SV.League Men's Champions
Team roster	Setter: Shunsuke Nakamura, Antoine Brizard, Ryo Nozoe Libero: Tomohiro Yamamoto, Kotaro Ikeshiro; MB: Kotaro Kaneta, Shikun Peng, Akihiro Yamauchi, Keitaro Nishikawa, Larry Evbade-Dan; OP: Kunihiro Shimizu, Yuji Nishida, Hiroto Nishiyama; OH: Shoma Tomita, Kenyu Nakamoto, Masato Kai, Bryan Bagunas, Miguel Lopez
Head Coach	Tuomas Sammelvuo

Source: SV.League Men's - Final Standings

== Awards ==
Awards	Name of the Awards	Name of the Winner	Team Name	Records
Club Award	SV.League Champions	Osaka Bluteon		
Club Award	SV.League Runners-up	Suntory Sunbirds Osaka		
Club Award	Championship Final Four-T	JTEKT Stings Aichi		
Club Award	Championship Final Four-B	Wolfdogs Nagoya		
Club Award	Regular Season Winners	Suntory Sunbirds Osaka		
Club Award	Best Youth Scheme	Osaka Bluteon		
Club Award	Best Community Engagement Award	JTEKT Stings Aichi		
Club Award	Best Community Engagement Award	Osaka Bluteon		
Leaders Award	Top Scorer	(France) Stephen Boyer	JTEKT Stings Aichi	869 pts.
Leaders Award	Top Spiker	(Cuba) Miguel Lopez	Osaka Bluteon	54.4%
Leaders Award	Top Server	(Japan) Taito Mizumachi	Wolfdogs Nagoya	15.0%
Leaders Award	Top Blocker	(Poland) Norbert Huber	Wolfdogs Nagoya	0.68/set
Leaders Award	Top Serve Receiver	(Japan) Kohei Tonozaki	Voreas Hokkaido	53.4%
Individual Award	Regular Season MVP	(Russia) Dmitry Muserskiy	Suntory Sunbirds Osaka	
Individual Award	Best Six	(Russia) Dmitry Muserskiy	Suntory Sunbirds Osaka	
Individual Award	Best Six	(Japan) Ran Takahashi	Suntory Sunbirds Osaka	
Individual Award	Best Six	(Cuba) Miguel Lopez	Osaka Bluteon	
Individual Award	Best Six	(Poland) Norbert Huber	Wolfdogs Nagoya	
Individual Award	Best Six	(Estonia) Timo Tammemaa	Voreas Hokkaido	
Individual Award	Best Six	(France) Antoine Brizard	Osaka Bluteon	
Individual Award	Libero of the Year	(Japan) Tomohiro Yamamoto	Osaka Bluteon	
Individual Award	Receiver of the Year	(Japan) Ran Takahashi	Suntory Sunbirds Osaka	
Individual Award	Head Coach of the Year	(France) Olivier Lecat	Suntory Sunbirds Osaka	
Individual Award	Championship MVP	(Japan) Yuji Nishida	Osaka Bluteon	
Individual Award	Rookie of the Year	(United States) Cooper Robinson	Hiroshima Thunders	
Individual Award	Fair Play Prize	(Russia) Dmitry Muserskiy	Suntory Sunbirds Osaka	5 sheets
Individual Award	Most Impressive Player	(France) Antoine Brizard	Osaka Bluteon	
Special Achievement Award	Arena of the Year	Wolfdogs Nagoya		
Special Achievement Award	Recruit Staff Award	(Japan) Taito Mizumachi	Wolfdogs Nagoya	
Lifetime Achievement Award		(Japan) Naoya Takano	Nippon Steel Sakai Blazers	
Lifetime Achievement Award		(Russia) Dmitry Muserskiy	Suntory Sunbirds Osaka	
Lifetime Achievement Award		(Japan) Kunihiro Shimizu	Osaka Bluteon	

Source: SV.League Men's - Award

== Statistics leaders ==
Best Scorers
	Player	Team	Attacks	Blocks	Serves	Total
1	(France) Stephen Boyer	JTEKT Stings Aichi	746	87	36	869
2	(Russia) Dmitry Muserskiy	Suntory Sunbirds Osaka	671	95	55	821
3	(Poland) Bartosz Kurek	Tokyo Great Bears	653	69	21	743
4	(Japan) Kento Miyaura	Wolfdogs Nagoya	607	50	52	709
5	(Italy) Tommaso Rinaldi	Nippon Steel Sakai Blazers	570	44	38	652

Best Attackers
	Player	Team	Attempts	Points	Errors	Success
1	(Cuba) Miguel Lopez	Osaka Bluteon	989	538	69	54.4%
2	(Japan) Ran Takahashi	Suntory Sunbirds Osaka	1012	540	71	53.4%
3	(Russia) Dmitry Muserskiy	Suntory Sunbirds Osaka	1259	671	88	53.4%
4	(United States) Torey Defalco	JTEKT Stings Aichi	1050	548	69	52.2%
5	(Italy) Tommaso Rinaldi	Nippon Steel Sakai Blazers	1105	570	68	51.6%

Best Blockers
	Player	Team	Set	Points	Per Set
1	(Poland) Norbert Huber	Wolfdogs Nagoya	142	97	0.68
2	(Russia) Dmitry Muserskiy	Suntory Sunbirds Osaka	143	95	0.66
3	(Estonia) Timo Tammemaa	Voreas Hokkaido	161	98	0.61
4	(Japan) Hiromasa Miwa	Hiroshima Thunders	156	82	0.53
5	(France) Stephen Boyer	JTEKT Stings Aichi	166	87	0.52

Best Servers
	Player	Team	Aces	Errors	Effects	Attempts	Effect %
1	(Japan) Taito Mizumachi	Wolfdogs Nagoya	65	162	271	617	15.0%
2	(Estonia) Märt Tammearu	Voreas Hokkaido	40	78	243	557	14.6%
3	(Japan) Ran Takahashi	Suntory Sunbirds Osaka	57	112	258	670	14.0%
4	(Russia) Dmitry Muserskiy	Suntory Sunbirds Osaka	55	135	212	555	13.4%
5	(Brazil) Felipe Roque	Hiroshima Thunders	39	97	241	567	13.2%

Best Receivers
	Player	Team	Perfect	Positive	Fail	Attempts	Positive %
1	(Japan) Kohei Tonozaki	Voreas Hokkaido	306	181	256	743	53.4%
2	(Japan) Aiki Mori	Nippon Steel Sakai Blazers	352	209	304	865	52.8%
3	(Japan) Shoma Tomita	Osaka Bluteon	323	206	309	838	50.8%
4	(Japan) Ran Takahashi	Suntory Sunbirds Osaka	256	230	268	754	49.2%
5	(Japan) Taishu Takeda	Toray Arrows Shizuoka	306	231	333	870	48.4%

Source: SV.League - Individual Ranking

== See also ==
2025–26 SV.League Women's
