= 2024–25 SV.League Men's =

Japanese volleyball league

2024-25 SV.League Men's
- Sport: Volleyball
- Duration: October 12, 2024 - May 4, 2025
- Teams: 10
- League champions: Suntory Sunbirds Osaka
- Runners-up: JTEKT Stings Aichi

Seasons
- 2025-26

The Volleyball 2024–25 SV.League Men's is the first tournament of the newly established SV.League which scheduled from October 12, 2024, to May 5, 2025.

== Clubs ==
2024–25 SV.League Men's
Club	Head Coach	Captain	City, Prefecture	Colors	Affiliation
Voreas Hokkaido	(Croatia) Edo Klein	(Chinese Taipei) Chen-Chien Chen	Asahikawa, Hokkaido		Voreas
Tokyo Great Bears	(Finland) Kasper Vuorinen	(Japan) Koga Taichiro	Koto, Tokyo		Nature Lab
VC Nagano Tridents	(Japan) Shinji Kawamura	(Japan) Shota Fujiwara	Takamori, Nagano		VC Nagano Create Sports
Toray Arrows Shizuoka	(Japan) Yuta Abe	(Japan) Tobias Takeshi Shigeto	Mishima, Shizuoka		Toray Industries
JTEKT Stings Aichi	(Poland) Michał Gogol	(Japan) Kazuyuki Takahashi	Kariya, Aichi		JTEKT Corporation
Wolfdogs Nagoya	(Italy) Valerio Baldovin	(Japan) Kenta Takanashi	Inazawa, Aichi		Toyoda Gosei
Osaka Bluteon	(France) Laurent Tillie	(Japan) Akihiro Yamauchi	Hirakata, Osaka		Panasonic Corporation
Suntory Sunbirds Osaka	(France) Olivier Lecat	(Japan) Kenya Fujinaka	Minoh, Osaka		Suntory Holdings
Nippon Steel Sakai Blazers	(Japan) Takeshi Kitajima	(Japan) Shohei Yamaguchi	Sakai, Osaka		Nippon Steel Corporation
Hiroshima Thunders	(Argentina) Carlos Javier Weber	(Japan) Makoto Nishimura	Hiroshima, Hiroshima		Japan Tobacco

== Transfer players ==
2024–25 SV.League Men's Inbound Transfers
Player	Coming from	Coming to	Ref.
(Japan) Kenshin Kuwada	(Japan) Suntory Sunbirds Osaka	(Japan) Voreas Hokkaido	
(Japan) Kota Ikeda	(Japan) VC Nagano Tridents	(Japan) Voreas Hokkaido	
(Japan) Keisuke Miyoshi	(Japan) Veertien Mie	(Japan) Voreas Hokkaido	
(Chinese Taipei) Chen-Chien Chen	(Japan) Hokkaido Yellow Stars	(Japan) Voreas Hokkaido	
(Ukraine) Nikita Zolotukhin	(France) Arago de Sete CFC	(Japan) Voreas Hokkaido	
(Estonia) Timo Tammemaa	(Germany) Berlin Recycling Volleys	(Japan) Voreas Hokkaido	
(Japan) Kyosuke Higuruma	(Japan) Fukuoka University	(Japan) Voreas Hokkaido	
(Japan) Manato Nakamichi	(Japan) Tokai University	(Japan) Voreas Hokkaido	
(Japan) Issei Otake	(South Korea) Seoul Woori Card WooriWON	(Japan) Tokyo Great Bears	
(Portugal) Alex Ferreira	(Poland) BOGDANKA LUK Lublin	(Japan) Tokyo Great Bears	
(Poland) Maciej Muzaj	(Poland) Stal Nysa	(Japan) Tokyo Great Bears	
(Japan) Ryusei Kurokawa	(Japan) Osaka Sangyo University	(Japan) Tokyo Great Bears	
(Japan) Ryuki Ohmae	(Japan) Aichi Gakuin University	(Japan) Tokyo Great Bears	
(Japan) Takuma Kawano	(Japan) Sundai Gakuen High School	(Japan) Tokyo Great Bears	
(Denmark) Ulrik Bo Dahl	(Spain) CV San Roque Batan	(Japan) VC Nagano Tridents	
(Japan) Koji Nanba	(Japan) Nagano GaRons	(Japan) VC Nagano Tridents	
(Japan) Yuki Higuchi	(Japan) Nippon Steel Sakai Blazers	(Japan) VC Nagano Tridents	
(Japan) Hiroshi Sakoda	(Japan) Nippon Steel Sakai Blazers	(Japan) VC Nagano Tridents	
(Japan) Shodai Abe	(Japan) Oita Miyoshi Weisse Adler	(Japan) VC Nagano Tridents	
(Japan) Shinnosuke Hayasaka	(Japan) Daido Steel Chita Red Star	(Japan) VC Nagano Tridents	
(Japan) Shusuke Sakai	(Japan) Tenri University	(Japan) VC Nagano Tridents	
(Japan) Ichijo Takamaru	(Japan) Nippon Steel Sakai Blazers	(Japan) VC Nagano Tridents	
(Japan) Hazuki Kishikawa	(Japan) Toa University	(Japan) VC Nagano Tridents	
(Japan) Takahiro Shin	(Japan) Osaka Bluteon	(Japan) Toray Arrows Shizuoka	
(Japan) Yuto Fujinaka	(Japan) JTEKT Stings Aichi	(Japan) Toray Arrows Shizuoka	
(Brazil) Alan Souza	(Poland) AZS Olsztyn	(Japan) Toray Arrows Shizuoka	
(Italy) Francesco Recine	(Italy) Gas Sales Bluenergy Piacenza	(Japan) Toray Arrows Shizuoka	
(Japan) Ryusuke Nakamura	(Japan) Oita Miyoshi Weisse Adler	(Japan) Toray Arrows Shizuoka	
(Japan) Gaku Kusumoto	(Japan) Tenri University	(Japan) Toray Arrows Shizuoka	
(Japan) Kento Miyaura	(France) Paris Volley	(Japan) JTEKT Stings Aichi	
(Brazil) Ricardo Lucarelli	(Italy) Gas Sales Bluenergy Piacenza	(Japan) JTEKT Stings Aichi	
(United States) Torey DeFalco	(Poland) Resovia Rzeszów	(Japan) JTEKT Stings Aichi	
(Japan) Tomohiro Ogawa	(Japan) Wolfdogs Nagoya	(Japan) JTEKT Stings Aichi	
(Japan) Kentaro Takahashi	(Japan) Toray Arrows Shizuoka	(Japan) JTEKT Stings Aichi	
(Japan) Takuma Araki	(Japan) Kindai University	(Japan) JTEKT Stings Aichi	
(Netherlands) Nimir Abdel-Aziz	(Turkey) Halkbank	(Japan) Wolfdogs Nagoya	
(Slovenia) Tine Urnaut	(Japan) JTEKT Stings Aichi	(Japan) Wolfdogs Nagoya	
(Japan) Hideomi Fukatsu	(Japan) Osaka Bluteon	(Japan) Wolfdogs Nagoya	
(Japan) Shunsuke Watanabe	(Japan) Toray Arrows Shizuoka	(Japan) Wolfdogs Nagoya	
(Indonesia) Rivan Nurmulki	(Indonesia) Eka Mandiri Salatiga	(Japan) Wolfdogs Nagoya	
(Japan) Akira Sawada	(Japan) Chuo University	(Japan) Wolfdogs Nagoya	
(Japan) Masahiro Yamazaki	(Japan) Chuo University	(Japan) Wolfdogs Nagoya	
(Japan) Jo Toyoda	(Japan) Gifu Kyoritsu University	(Japan) Wolfdogs Nagoya	
(Japan) Shoma Tomita	(Japan) Toray Arrows Shizuoka	(Japan) Osaka Bluteon	
(Japan) Motoki Eiro	(Japan) Wolfdogs Nagoya	(Japan) Osaka Bluteon	
(Cuba) Miguel Lopez	(Qatar) Al Rayyan SC	(Japan) Osaka Bluteon	
(Japan) Kotaro Kaneta	(Japan) Meiji University	(Japan) Osaka Bluteon	
(Japan) Keita Takeuchi	(Japan) Senshu University	(Japan) Osaka Bluteon	
(Japan) Masato Kai	(Japan) Senshu University	(Japan) Osaka Bluteon	
(Japan) Ran Takahashi	(Italy) Mint Vero Volley Monza	(Japan) Suntory Sunbirds Osaka	
(Poland) Aleksander Sliwka	(Poland) ZAKSA Kędzierzyn-Koźle	(Japan) Suntory Sunbirds Osaka	
(Japan) Ryo Shimokawa	(Japan) VC Nagano Tridents	(Japan) Suntory Sunbirds Osaka	
(Japan) Takumi Eto	(Japan) Fujitsu Kawasaki Red Spirits	(Japan) Nippon Steel Sakai Blazers	
(Argentina) Luciano Palonsky	(Ukraine) Barkom Każany Lwów	(Japan) Nippon Steel Sakai Blazers	
(Chinese Taipei) Pei-Chang Tsai	(South Korea) Cheonan Hyundai Capital Skywalkers	(Japan) Nippon Steel Sakai Blazers	
(Japan) Hiroyuki Yamane	(Japan) Chuo University	(Japan) Nippon Steel Sakai Blazers	
(Japan) Takehiro Nakanishi	(Japan) University of Tsukuba	(Japan) Nippon Steel Sakai Blazers	
(Japan) Akira Kakizaki	(Japan) Chuo University	(Japan) Nippon Steel Sakai Blazers	
(Japan) Yuri Yanagida	(Japan) Toa University	(Japan) Hiroshima Thunders	
(Japan) Kaiki Takanashi	(Japan) Toa University	(Japan) Hiroshima Thunders	

== Schedule ==
=== Regular season ===
The season began on Saturday, October 12, 2024, and ended on Sunday, April 13, 2025.

1. Each club will play a total of 44 matches in a home-and-away format, with 22 of those matches being home games.
2. The top 6 clubs from the regular season will advance to the Championship.
3. The final standings for the clubs ranked 7th to 10th will be determined based on the results of the regular season.
4. All matches will be played as best-of-five sets.

=== Championship ===
The season began on April 18, 2025, and ended on May 5, 2025.

1. The Championship will be conducted in a tournament format.
2. The clubs ranked 3rd to 6th at the end of the regular season will compete in the Quarterfinals. The winners of the Quarterfinals will advance to the Semifinals.
3. The top two clubs from the regular season, along with the winners of the Quarterfinals, will compete in the Semifinals. The winners of the Semifinals will advance to the Finals.
4. There will be no ranking matches for the clubs that lose in the Quarterfinals and Semifinals, and the final rankings for the clubs placed 3rd to 6th will be determined based on their final standings in the regular season.
5. All matches, except for the Final, will be hosted by the higher-ranked club from the regular season.
6. All matches will be played as best-of-five sets.

== Season standing procedure ==
=== Regular season ===
Points awarded per match are as follows:

- 3 Points: Win with a set score of "3-0" or "3-1"
- 2 Points: Win with a set score of "3-2"
- 1 Point: Loss with a set score of "2-3"
- 0 Points: Loss with a set score of "0-3" or "1-3"

=== Championship ===
A best-of-three format will be used, with the team winning two out of three matches advancing.

If both teams have one win each, a third match will be played to determine the winner.

== Regular round ==
Qualified for the Final

2024–25 SV.League Men's Regular Round Final Standing
Rank	Team	Match	Win	Loss	Point	Win Ratio	Win Set	Loss Set	Set Rates
1	Osaka Bluteon	44	37	7	106	0.84	118	47	2.51
2	Suntory Sunbirds Osaka	44	36	8	107	0.82	119	44	2.70
3	Wolfdogs Nagoya	44	35	9	104	0.80	119	52	2.29
4	JTEKT Stings Aichi	44	26	18	71	0.59	93	84	1.11
5	Tokyo Great Bears	44	23	21	73	0.52	94	82	1.15
6	Hiroshima Thunders	44	18	26	55	0.41	76	94	0.81
7	Nippon Steel Sakai Blazers	44	15	29	50	0.34	70	98	0.71
8	Toray Arrows Shizuoka	44	12	32	39	0.27	62	111	0.56
9	VC Nagano Tridents	44	10	34	27	0.23	45	115	0.39
10	Voreas Hokkaido	44	8	36	28	0.18	50	119	0.42

== Final ranking ==
Rank	Club
1st place, gold medalist(s)	Suntory Sunbirds Osaka
2nd place, silver medalist(s)	JTEKT Stings Aichi
3rd place, bronze medalist(s)	Osaka Bluteon
4	Wolfdogs Nagoya
5	Tokyo Great Bears
6	Hiroshima Thunders
7	Nippon Steel Sakai Blazers
8	Toray Arrows Shizuoka
9	VC Nagano Tridents
10	Voreas Hokkaido

2024–25 SV.League Men's Champions
Team roster	Setter: Ryo Shimokawa, Masaki Oya, Hiroki Nishida Libero: Soshi Fujinaka, Yoshimitsu Kiire; MB: Taishi Onodera, Kenji Sato, Ren Oniki, Hirohito Kashimura, Tatsuki Kashiwada; OP: Atomu Torikai, Dmitriy Muserskiy, Kotaro Kai; OH: Alain De Armas, Kenya Fujinaka, Aleksander Sliwka, Ran Takahashi, Hikaru Someno, Rui Takahashi
Head Coach	Olivier Lecat

== Awards ==
Awards	Name of the Awards	Name of the Winner	Team Name	Records
Club Award	SV.League Champions	Suntory Sunbirds Osaka		
Club Award	SV.League Runners-up	JTEKT Stings Aichi		
Club Award	Championship Final Four-T	Osaka Bluteon		
Club Award	Championship Final Four-B	Wolfdogs Nagoya		
Club Award	Regular Season Winners	Osaka Bluteon		
Club Award	Best Youth Scheme	Osaka Bluteon		
Club Award	Best Community Engagement Award	Wolfdogs Nagoya		
Leaders Award	Top Scorer	(Netherlands) Nimir Abdel-Aziz	Wolfdogs Nagoya	1181 pts.
Leaders Award	Top Spiker	(Netherlands) Nimir Abdel-Aziz	Wolfdogs Nagoya	57.5%
Leaders Award	Top Server	(Netherlands) Nimir Abdel-Aziz	Wolfdogs Nagoya	17.7%
Leaders Award	Top Blocker	(Japan) Keigo Nishimoto	Toray Arrows Shizuoka	0.618/set
Leaders Award	Top Serve Receiver	(Japan) Aiki Mori	Nippon Steel Sakai Blazers	55.2%
Individual Award	Regular Season MVP	(Netherlands) Nimir Abdel-Aziz	Wolfdogs Nagoya	
Individual Award	Best Six	(Netherlands) Nimir Abdel-Aziz	Wolfdogs Nagoya	
Individual Award	Best Six	(Cuba) Miguel Lopez	Osaka Bluteon	
Individual Award	Best Six	(Japan) Ran Takahashi	Suntory Sunbirds Osaka	
Individual Award	Best Six	(Japan) Larry Ik Evbade-Dan	Osaka Bluteon	
Individual Award	Best Six	(Japan) Keigo Nishimoto	Toray Arrows Shizuoka	
Individual Award	Best Six	(Japan) Hideomi Fukatsu	Wolfdogs Nagoya	
Individual Award	Libero of the Year	(Japan) Tomohiro Yamamoto	Osaka Bluteon	
Individual Award	Receiver of the Year	(Japan) Ran Takahashi	Suntory Sunbirds Osaka	
Individual Award	Head Coach of the Year	(France) Laurent Tillie	Osaka Bluteon	
Individual Award	Championship MVP	(Japan) Ran Takahashi	Suntory Sunbirds Osaka	
Individual Award	Rookie of the Year	(Japan) Taito Mizumachi	Wolfdogs Nagoya	
Individual Award	Fair Play Prize	(Japan) Alain De Armas	Suntory Sunbirds Osaka	6 sheets
Individual Award	Most Impressive Player	(Netherlands) Nimir Abdel-Aziz	Wolfdogs Nagoya	
Special Achievement Award	Arena of the Year	Osaka Bluteon		
Special Achievement Award	Breakthrough of the Year	Nippon Steel Sakai Blazers		
Special Achievement Award	Attack the Top Award	(Japan) Yuji Nishida	Osaka Bluteon	
Special Achievement Award	Attack the Top Award	(Japan) Ran Takahashi	Suntory Sunbirds Osaka	
Lifetime Achievement Award		(Japan) Yuta Yoneyama	Toray Arrows Shizuoka	
Lifetime Achievement Award		(Japan) Hirotaka Kon	Wolfdogs Nagoya	
Lifetime Achievement Award		(Japan) Yoji Hayano	JTEKT Stings Aichi	
