= 2026 AVC Men's Volleyball Continental Championship squads =

The 2026 AVC Men's Volleyball Continental Championship was an international volleyball tournament held in Japan from 4 to 13 September 2026. The 12 national teams involved in the tournament were required to register a squad of up to 14 players. A provisional release list of 25 players per national team had to be submitted to AVC on 5 August 2026, one month prior to the opening match of the tournament. The release lists were made public via Volleyball World website. From the preliminary squad, the final list of at least 12 and at most 14 players (at least one of whom shall be libero) per national team had to be submitted to AVC on 28 August 2026, seven days prior to the opening match of the tournament. The squad lists were published by AVC the following day.

== Pool A ==
=== Japan ===
The following is Japan roster for the 2026 AVC Men's Volleyball Continental Championship.

Japan men's national volleyball team – 2026 AVC Continental roster
Players
Coaches

Pos.	No.	Name	Age – Date of birth	Height	Club
OP	1	Yuji Nishida	26 – 30 January 2000	1.87 m (6 ft 2 in)	Osaka Bluteon
MB	2	Taishi Onodera	30 – 27 February 1996	2.02 m (6 ft 8 in)	Suntory Sunbirds Osaka
S	3	Hideomi Fukatsu	36 – 1 June 1990	1.81 m (5 ft 11 in)	Wolfdogs Nagoya
OP	4	Kento Miyaura	27 – 22 February 1999	1.90 m (6 ft 3 in)	Wolfdogs Nagoya
OH	5	Tatsunori Otsuka	1,825 – 5 November 200	1.95 m (6 ft 5 in)	Power Volley Milano
MB	6	Akihiro Yamauchi	32 – 30 November 1993	2.04 m (6 ft 8 in)	Osaka Bluteon
S	9	Yudai Kawahigashi	28 – 7 February 1998	1.75 m (5 ft 9 in)	JTEKT Stings Aichi
OH	11	Shoma Tomita	29 – 20 June 1997	1.90 m (6 ft 3 in)	Osaka Bluteon
OH	12	Ran Takahashi	25 – 2 September 2001	1.88 m (6 ft 2 in)	Suntory Sunbirds Osaka
L	13	Tomohiro Ogawa	30 – 4 July 1996	1.76 m (5 ft 9 in)	Suntory Sunbirds Osaka
OH	14	Yūki Ishikawa (C)	30 – 11 December 1995	1.91 m (6 ft 3 in)	Sir Safety Perugia
MB	17	Keigo Nishimoto	27 – 27 October 1998	1.88 m (6 ft 2 in)	Hiroshima Thunders
L	20	Tomohiro Yamamoto	31 – 5 November 1994	1.71 m (5 ft 7 in)	Osaka Bluteon
MB	23	Larry Evbade-dan	26 – 18 August 2000	1.95 m (6 ft 5 in)	Osaka Bluteon

Head coach

- (France) Laurent Tillie

Assistant coach(es)

- (Japan) Kenji Itoh
- (Japan) Takayuki Fukatsu
- (Japan) Tomohiko Sakanashi

Legend

- (C) – team captain
- Club – describes last
  club before the tournament
- Age – describes age
  on 4 September 2026

=== Australia ===
The following is Australia roster for the 2026 AVC Men's Volleyball Continental Championship.

Australia men's national volleyball team – 2026 AVC Continental roster
Players	Coaches
Pos. / No. / Name / Age – Date of birth / Height / Club; / / [[ | ]] / –	Head coach Assistant coach(es) Legend: (C) – team captain; Club – describes last club before the tournament; Age – describes age on 4 September 2026

=== Bahrain ===
The following is Bahrain roster for the 2026 AVC Men's Volleyball Continental Championship.

Bahrain men's national volleyball team – 2026 AVC Continental roster
Players	Coaches
Pos. / No. / Name / Age – Date of birth / Height / Club / Ctr.; / / [[ | ]] / –	Head coach Assistant coach(es) Legend: (C) – team captain; Club – describes last club before the tournament; Age – describes age on 4 September 2026

=== Oman ===
The following is Oman roster for the 2026 AVC Men's Volleyball Continental Championship.

Oman men's national volleyball team – 2026 AVC Continental roster
Players	Coaches
Pos. / No. / Name / Age – Date of birth / Height / Club; / / [[ | ]] / –	Head coach Assistant coach(es) Legend: (C) – team captain; Club – describes last club before the tournament; Age – describes age on 4 September 2026

== Pool B ==
=== Iran ===
The following is the Iran roster for the 2026 AVC Men's Volleyball Continental Championship.

Iran men's national volleyball team – 2026 AVC Continental roster
Players	Coaches
Pos. / No. / Name / Age – Date of birth / Height / Club; / / [[ | ]] / –	Head coach Assistant coach(es) Legend: (C) – team captain; Club – describes last club before the tournament; Age – describes age on 4 September 2026

=== China ===
The following is the China roster for the 2026 AVC Men's Volleyball Continental Championship.

China men's national volleyball team – 2026 AVC Continental roster
Players	Coaches
Pos. / No. / Name / Age – Date of birth / Height / Club; / / [[ | ]] / –	Head coach Assistant coach(es) Legend: (C) – team captain; Club – describes last club before the tournament; Age – describes age on 4 September 2026

=== India ===
The following is the India roster for the 2026 AVC Men's Volleyball Continental Championship.

India men's national volleyball team – 2026 AVC Continental roster
Players	Coaches
Pos. / No. / Name / Age – Date of birth / Height / Club; / / [[ | ]] / –	Head coach Assistant coach(es) Legend: (C) – team captain; Club – describes last club before the tournament; Age – describes age on 4 September 2026

=== New Zealand ===
The following is the New Zealand roster for the 2026 AVC Men's Volleyball Continental Championship.

New Zealand men's national volleyball team – 2026 AVC Continental roster
Players	Coaches
Pos. / No. / Name / Age – Date of birth / Height / Club; / / [[ | ]] / –	Head coach Assistant coach(es) Legend: (C) – team captain; Club – describes last club before the tournament; Age – describes age on 4 September 2026

== Pool C ==
=== Qatar ===
The following is the Qatar roster for the 2026 AVC Men's Volleyball Continental Championship.

Qatar men's national volleyball team – 2026 AVC Continental roster
Players	Coaches
Pos. / No. / Name / Age – Date of birth / Height / Club; / / [[ | ]] / –	Head coach Assistant coach(es) Legend: (C) – team captain; Club – describes last club before the tournament; Age – describes age on 4 September 2026

=== South Korea ===
The following is South Korea roster for the 2026 AVC Men's Volleyball Continental Championship.

South Korea men's national volleyball team – 2026 AVC Continental roster
Players	Coaches
Pos. / No. / Name / Age – Date of birth / Height / Club; / / [[ | ]] / –	Head coach Assistant coach(es) Legend: (C) – team captain; Club – describes last club before the tournament; Age – describes age on 4 September 2026

=== Chinese Taipei ===
The following is the Chinese Taipei roster for the 2026 AVC Men's Volleyball Continental Championship.

Chinese Taipei men's national volleyball team – 2026 AVC Continental roster
Players	Coaches
Pos. / No. / Name / Age – Date of birth / Height / Club; / / [[ | ]] / –	Head coach: [[]]; Assistant coach(es) Legend: (C) – team captain; Club – describes last club before the tournament; Age – describes age on 4 September 2026

=== Thailand ===
The following is the Thailand roster for the 2026 AVC Men's Volleyball Continental Championship.

Thailand men's national volleyball team – 2026 AVC Continental roster
Players	Coaches
Pos. / No. / Name / Age – Date of birth / Height / Club; / / [[ | ]] / –	Head coach: [[]]; Assistant coach(es) Legend: (C) – team captain; Club – describes last club before the tournament; Age – describes age on 4 September 2026
