= Rui Takahashi =

Japanese volleyball player (born 2000)

Personal information
- Nationality: Japanese
- Born: 14 January 2000 (age 26); Kyoto, Japan
- Height: 186 cm (6 ft 1 in)
- Weight: 80 kg (176 lb)

Volleyball information
- Position: Outside hiiter
- Current club: (Japan) Suntory Sunbirds
- Number: 21 (Suntory Sunbirds)

Career
Years	Teams
2022–present	(Japan) Suntory Sunbirds

Rui Takahashi (髙橋 塁, Takahashi Rui; born 14 January 2000) is a Japanese volleyball player who plays as an outside hitter for Suntory Sunbirds in the SV.League. He played college volleyball at Nihon University.

== Early life ==
Rui Takahashi was born on 14 January 2000 in Kyoto Prefecture, Japan. His mother is Japanese of part British and German descent, and his father is Japanese. Ran has one brother, Ran, who is one and a half years younger, and one younger sister, Riri, both of whom also play volleyball.

== Career ==
=== Youth career ===
Takahashi began playing volleyball at the age of eight after being influence by watching Megumi Kurihara play, after which he joined an elementary school team. His younger brother, Ran also joined the same team when he was in the second grade of elementary school.

Both Takahashi and his brother played for Kyoto Municipal Hachigaoka Junior High School. Due to his height, in the first grade, Ran was mainly used as a Libero, while Takahashi himself played as the ace and participated in the national tournament.

Afterward, Takahashi attended Higashiyama High School In his third year of high school, Ran also joined the team, and at that time, the brothers formed a pair of ace players opposite of each other. It was then that Takahashi realized that Ran would even become even become a greater player than himself.

=== College career ===
After graduating from high school, Takahashi enrolled at Nihon University, where he became a regular starter in his first year. Ran enrolled at Nippon Sport Science University, thus the brothers did not play together, although a match between them did happen. In his third year, he contributed to the team's third place finish at the All Japan Intercollegiate Championship, their first in 45 years. In his fourth year, he was appointed team captain. However, he injured his lower back during summer practice, rendering him unable to competed in his final Intercollegiate Championship. He stated that working behind the scenes at the Intercollegiate Championship made him realize the importance of the support he received from players who couldn't play.

=== Club career ===
Althought Takahashi was unable to play due to lower back pain, he was offered a contract by the Suntory Sunbirds for the 2021–22 season and signed with them in 2022 after graduating from university. During his first season with the club, the Sunbirds beat Indonesia's Bhayangkara in the final to become the first Japanese club to win the Asian Men's Club Volleyball Championship title. This led them to qualify for the FIVB Volleyball Men's Club World Championship, where they won bronze after they reverse sweeped Halkbank Spor Kulübü for the 3rd place match. In the 2024–25 season, his team were the inaugural SV.League Men's champions and finished runners-up the following season.

== Ambassadorship ==
Alongside his brother Ran, Takahashi also serves as an official Kyoto Prefecture Cultural Tourism Ambassador since May 2025.

== Personal life ==
Takahashi's given name derives from the word "sōrui", meaning base running, because his father was a baseball fan. Coincidentally, his younger brother's name Ran is in reference to the word "home run".

On 29 September 2026, Takahashi came out as gay, becoming the first male professional athlete in Japan to do so.

== Awards ==
=== Honors ===
==== Club ====
(Japan) Suntory Sunbirds

- FIVB Volleyball Men's Club World Championship

(×1): 2023

- Asian Men's Club Volleyball Championship

(×1): 2023
(×1): 2025

- Japan Volleyball League/V.League/V.Premier League/V.League Division 1

(×1): 2023–2024
(×1): 2022–2023

- SV.League

(×1): 2024–2025
(×1): 2025–2026

- Emperor's Cup

(×1): 2024
