= 2017–18 V.Premier League Men's =

- League: V.League Division 1
- Sport: Volleyball
- Duration: October 21, 2017 – March 18, 2018
- Number of games: 104
- Number of teams: 8

Regular Season
- Season champions: Panasonic Panthers
- Season MVP: (Poland) Michał Kubiak
- Top scorer: (Australia) Thomas Edgar
- Runners-up: Toyoda Gosei Trefuerza

Seasons
- ← 2016–17 2018–19 →

The Volleyball 2017–18 V.Premier League Men's was the 24th tournament of the V.League which were held from October 21, 2017 – March 18, 2018.

== Regular round ==
=== Regular round standing procedure ===
1. Total number of victories (matches won, matched lost)
2. In the event of a tie, the following first tiebreaker will apply: The teams will be ranked by the most point gained per match as follows:
  - Match won 3–0 or 3–1: 3 points for the winner, 0 points for the loser
  - Match won 3–2: 2 points for the winner, 1 point for the loser
  - Match forfeited: 3 points for the winner, 0 points (0–25, 0–25, 0–25) for the loser
3. If teams are still tied after examining the number of victories and points gained, then the FIVB will examine the results in order to break the tie in the following order:
  - Set quotient: if two or more teams are tied on the number of points gained, they will be ranked by the quotient resulting from the division of the number of all set won by the number of all sets lost.
  - Points quotient: if the tie persists based on the set quotient, the teams will be ranked by the quotient resulting from the division of all points scored by the total of points lost during all sets.
  - If the tie persists based on the point quotient, the tie will be broken based on the team that won the match of the Round Robin Phase between the tied teams. When the tie in point quotient is between three or more teams, these teams ranked taking into consideration only the matches involving the teams in question.

=== Standings ===
Pos	Team	Pld	W	L	Pts	SW	SL	SR	SPW	SPL	SPR	Qualification
1	Panasonic Panthers	21	18	3	52	57	23	2.478	1868	1631	1.145	Final six
2	Toyoda Gosei Trefuerza	21	15	6	41	49	31	1.581	1837	1771	1.037	Final six
3	Toray Arrows	21	14	7	38	46	34	1.353	1807	1789	1.010	Final six
4	JT Thunders	21	12	9	37	46	36	1.278	1876	1798	1.043	Final six
5	Suntory Sunbirds	21	8	13	28	38	45	0.844	1806	1839	0.982	Final six
6	JTEKT Stings	21	8	13	25	33	45	0.733	1764	1811	0.974	Final six
7	Osaka Blazers Sakai	21	7	14	23	33	49	0.673	1806	1882	0.960	
8	FC Tokyo	21	2	19	8	19	58	0.328	1604	1847	0.868	

=== Leg 1 ===
- All times are Japan Standard Time (UTC+09:00).

==== Week 1 ====
Date	Time		Score		Set 1	Set 2	Set 3	Set 4	Set 5	Total	Report
21 Oct	13:00	JT Thunders	3–2	Suntory Sunbirds	25–14	25–27	25–23	23–25	15–12	113–101	
21 Oct	16:15	FC Tokyo	0–3	Panasonic Panthers	20–25	21–25	19–25			60–75	
22 Oct	12:05	Toray Arrows	0–3	Toyoda Gosei Trefuerza	21–25	22–25	22–25			65–75	
22 Oct	14:15	JTEKT Stings	3–1	Osaka Blazers Sakai	25–20	23–25	25–21	26–24		99–90	

==== Week 2 ====
Date	Time		Score		Set 1	Set 2	Set 3	Set 4	Set 5	Total	Report
28 Oct	13:00	JT Thunders	1–3	Toyoda Gosei Trefuerza	18–25	17–25	26–24	22–25		83–99	
28 Oct	13:00	Suntory Sunbirds	1–3	Panasonic Panthers	16–25	21–25	25–22	18–25		80–97	
28 Oct	15:35	FC Tokyo	0–3	JTEKT Stings	31–33	23–25	23–25			77–83	
28 Oct	15:35	Toray Arrows	3–1	Osaka Blazers Sakai	29–31	25–22	25–19	25–23		104–95	
29 Oct	13:00	FC Tokyo	1–3	JT Thunders	25–23	21–25	20–25	16–25		82–98	
29 Oct	13:00	Toray Arrows	1–3	Suntory Sunbirds	25–20	25–15	25–23	25–20		100–78	
29 Oct	15:40	Panasonic Panthers	3–1	Osaka Blazers Sakai	25–12	25–19	24–26	25–22		99–79	
29 Oct	15:45	JTEKT Stings	1–3	Toyoda Gosei Trefuerza	25–20	20–25	22–25	23–25		90–95	

==== Week 3 ====
Date	Time		Score		Set 1	Set 2	Set 3	Set 4	Set 5	Total	Report
4 Nov	13:00	JT Thunders	0–3	Panasonic Panthers	11–25	24–26	19–25			54–76	
4 Nov	13:00	FC Tokyo	1–3	Suntory Sunbirds	25–20	20–25	15–25	21–25		81–95	
4 Nov	15:05	Osaka Blazers Sakai	0–3	Toyoda Gosei Trefuerza	24–26	26–28	16–25			66–79	
4 Nov	15:30	Toray Arrows	3–0	JTEKT Stings	25–23	25–22	25–21			75–66	
5 Nov	13:00	FC Tokyo	1–3	Toray Arrows	20–25	24–26	25–18	23–25		92–94	
5 Nov	13:08	JT Thunders	3–0	Osaka Blazers Sakai	25–23	31–29	25–12			81–64	
5 Nov	15:25	Panasonic Panthers	2–3	Toyoda Gosei Trefuerza	20–25	18–25	25–18	25–20	13–15	101–103	
5 Nov	15:25	JTEKT Stings	3–0	Suntory Sunbirds	26–24	25–17	25–19			76–60	

==== Week 4 ====
Date	Time		Score		Set 1	Set 2	Set 3	Set 4	Set 5	Total	Report
11 Nov	12:00	Toray Arrows	1–3	Panasonic Panthers	26–24	22–25	16–25	18–25		82–99	
11 Nov	13:00	FC Tokyo	2–3	Toyoda Gosei Trefuerza	25–23	16–25	27–25	16–25	11–15	95–113	
11 Nov	14:35	JT Thunders	3–0	JTEKT Stings	25–18	25–18	25–22			75–58	
11 Nov	15:50	Suntory Sunbirds	2–3	Osaka Blazers Sakai	25–23	20–25	26–28	25–14	12–15	108–105	
12 Nov	12:00	JT Thunders	0–3	Toray Arrows	23–25	20–25	22–25			65–75	
12 Nov	13:00	Suntory Sunbirds	3–1	Toyoda Gosei Trefuerza	25–17	25–23	19–25	25–23		94–88	
12 Nov	14:10	JTEKT Stings	1–3	Panasonic Panthers	25–22	20–25	19–25	21–25		85–97	
12 Nov	15:30	FC Tokyo	1–3	Osaka Blazers Sakai	25–23	23–25	23–25	17–25		88–98	

=== Leg 2 ===
- All times are Japan Standard Time (UTC+09:00).

==== Week 1 ====
Date	Time		Score		Set 1	Set 2	Set 3	Set 4	Set 5	Total	Report
18 Nov	13:00	FC Tokyo	0–3	Toray Arrows	21–25	22–25	22–25			65–75	
18 Nov	13:00	JT Thunders	3–0	Osaka Blazers Sakai	26–24	25–19	25–16			76–59	
18 Nov	14:00	JTEKT Stings	3–0	Suntory Sunbirds	26–24	25–19	25–21			76–64	
19 Nov	13:00	Panasonic Panthers	3–1	Toyoda Gosei Trefuerza	20–25	25–16	25–20	25–21		95–82	

==== Week 2 ====
Date	Time		Score		Set 1	Set 2	Set 3	Set 4	Set 5	Total	Report
25 Nov	13:00	Toray Arrows	3–0	Toyoda Gosei Trefuerza	25–17	25–21	25–21			75–59	
25 Nov	13:00	FC Tokyo	0–3	Suntory Sunbirds	23–25	14–25	22–25			59–75	
25 Nov	15:10	JTEKT Stings	3–2	Osaka Blazers Sakai	19–25	22–25	25–22	25–17	15–11	106–100	
25 Nov	15:10	JT Thunders	1–3	Panasonic Panthers	15–25	25–23	18–25	21–25		79–98	
26 Nov	13:00	Toray Arrows	3–2	JTEKT Stings	25–17	23–25	25–21	21–25	17–15	111–103	
26 Nov	13:00	JT Thunders	3–1	Suntory Sunbirds	25–16	25–27	25–22	25–22		100–87	
26 Nov	15:40	FC Tokyo	1–3	Panasonic Panthers	19–25	25–18	17–25	21–25		82–93	
26 Nov	15:55	Osaka Blazers Sakai	3–1	Toyoda Gosei Trefuerza	25–17	25–18	22–25	25–18		97–78	

==== Week 3 ====
Date	Time		Score		Set 1	Set 2	Set 3	Set 4	Set 5	Total	Report
2 Dec	13:00	Toray Arrows	1–3	Osaka Blazers Sakai	25–19	20–25	18–25	29–31		92–100	
2 Dec	13:00	Suntory Sunbirds	0–3	Panasonic Panthers	18–25	14–25	19–25			51–75	
2 Dec	13:00	JTEKT Stings	0–3	Toyoda Gosei Trefuerza	19–25	22–25	20–25			61–75	
2 Dec	15:10	FC Tokyo	1–3	JT Thunders	19–25	18–25	27–25	19–25		83–100	
3 Dec	13:00	Suntory Sunbirds	3–1	Osaka Blazers Sakai	25–23	25–20	19–25	25–20		94–88	
3 Dec	13:00	Toray Arrows	0–3	Panasonic Panthers	20–25	14–25	13–25			47–75	
3 Dec	13:00	FC Tokyo	1–3	Toyoda Gosei Trefuerza	25–22	23–25	18–25	23–25		89–97	
3 Dec	15:35	JT Thunders	3–1	JTEKT Stings	25–27	25–23	25–23	25–20		100–93	

==== Week 4 ====
Date	Time		Score		Set 1	Set 2	Set 3	Set 4	Set 5	Total	Report
9 Dec	13:00	FC Tokyo	1–3	JTEKT Stings	19–25	25–21	18–25	20–25		82–96	
9 Dec	13:00	JT Thunders	2–3	Toray Arrows	27–25	25–19	21–25	23–25	12–15	108–109	
9 Dec	15:50	Panasonic Panthers	3–2	Osaka Blazers Sakai	19–25	23–25	25–23	25–12	15–13	107–98	
9 Dec	16:05	Suntory Sunbirds	3–0	Toyoda Gosei Trefuerza	25–19	26–24	25–15			76–58	
10 Dec	13:00	FC Tokyo	3–0	Osaka Blazers Sakai	25–22	25–22	25–19			75–63	
10 Dec	13:00	JT Thunders	1–3	Toyoda Gosei Trefuerza	25–22	16–25	23–25	19–25		83–97	
10 Dec	15:20	JTEKT Stings	1–3	Panasonic Panthers	25–18	24–26	27–29	19–25		95–98	
10 Dec	15:45	Toray Arrows	3–2	Suntory Sunbirds	21–25	25–23	21–25	25–16	15–11	107–100	

=== Leg 3 ===
- All times are Japan Standard Time (UTC+09:00).

==== Week 1 ====
Date	Time		Score		Set 1	Set 2	Set 3	Set 4	Set 5	Total	Report
6 Jan	13:00	FC Tokyo	0–3	Toyoda Gosei Trefuerza	21–25	14–25	20–25			55–75	
6 Jan	13:05	JT Thunders	1–3	Toray Arrows	25–19	22–25	19–25	23–25		89–94	
6 Jan	15:00	Suntory Sunbirds	0–3	Panasonic Panthers	18–25	21–25	18–25			57–75	
6 Jan	15:50	JTEKT Stings	0–3	Osaka Blazers Sakai	28–30	20–25	20–25			68–80	
7 Jan	13:00	Suntory Sunbirds	2–3	Toyoda Gosei Trefuerza	25–17	22–25	23–25	25–21	11–15	106–103	
7 Jan	13:00	Toray Arrows	3–2	Osaka Blazers Sakai	28–26	17–25	25–23	17–25	15–10	102–109	
7 Jan	15:50	JT Thunders	3–2	JTEKT Stings	25–19	23–25	25–23	19–25	15–11	107–103	
7 Jan	16:00	FC Tokyo	0–3	Panasonic Panthers	15–25	20–25	21–25			56–75	

==== Week 2 ====
Date	Time		Score		Set 1	Set 2	Set 3	Set 4	Set 5	Total	Report
12 Jan	19:08	Toray Arrows	0–3	Suntory Sunbirds	22–25	20–25	19–25			61–75	
13 Jan	13:00	FC Tokyo	3–1	JTEKT Stings	25–22	25–23	20–25	25–19		95–89	
13 Jan	13:00	Panasonic Panthers	1–3	Toyoda Gosei Trefuerza	27–29	17–25	28–26	16–25		88–105	
13 Jan	13:00	JT Thunders	3–0	Osaka Blazers Sakai	25–21	25–23	25–23			75–67	

==== Week 3 ====
Date	Time		Score		Set 1	Set 2	Set 3	Set 4	Set 5	Total	Report
20 Jan	13:00	FC Tokyo	1–3	Toray Arrows	14–25	25–15	19–25	17–25		75–90	
20 Jan	13:05	Panasonic Panthers	3–2	Osaka Blazers Sakai	25–20	19–25	23–25	25–21	18–16	110–107	
20 Jan	15:30	JTEKT Stings	3–1	Suntory Sunbirds	14–25	25–21	25–19	25–21		89–86	
20 Jan	16:10	JT Thunders	2–3	Toyoda Gosei Trefuerza	25–17	32–34	20–25	26–24	15–17	118–117	
21 Jan	13:00	FC Tokyo	2–3	Suntory Sunbirds	22–25	25–19	23–25	28–26	8–15	106–110	
21 Jan	13:00	Osaka Blazers Sakai	0–3	Toyoda Gosei Trefuerza	23–25	20–25	17–25			60–75	
21 Jan	15:05	JT Thunders	2–3	Panasonic Panthers	12–25	23–25	25–22	25–16	13–15	98–103	
21 Jan	15:50	Toray Arrows	1–3	JTEKT Stings	16–25	26–28	25–21	23–25		90–99	

==== Week 4 ====
Date	Time		Score		Set 1	Set 2	Set 3	Set 4	Set 5	Total	Report
27 Jan	13:00	FC Tokyo	0–3	Osaka Blazers Sakai	18–25	22–25	20–25			60–75	
27 Jan	13:00	Toray Arrows	3–0	Panasonic Panthers	25–20	25–20	25–17			75–57	
27 Jan	15:00	JT Thunders	3–1	Suntory Sunbirds	25–21	24–26	25–18	25–18		99–83	
27 Jan	15:00	JTEKT Stings	0–3	Toyoda Gosei Trefuerza	23–25	25–27	25–27			73–79	
28 Jan	13:00	FC Tokyo	0–3	JT Thunders	18–25	17–25	15–25			50–75	
28 Jan	13:00	Toray Arrows	3–1	Toyoda Gosei Trefuerza	25–13	25–23	22–25	29–27		101–88	
28 Jan	15:00	Suntory Sunbirds	2–3	Osaka Blazers Sakai	25–20	22–25	25–21	23–25	11–15	106–106	
28 Jan	15:35	JTEKT Stings	0–3	Panasonic Panthers	20–25	20–25	16–25			56–75	

== Final six round ==
=== Final six standing procedure ===
Ranking points of regular round; 1st place – 5 point, 2nd place – 4 point, 3rd place – 3 point, 4th place – 2 point, 5th place – 1 point, 6th place – 0 point

1. Total points (match points of final 6 and the ranking points of regular round)
2. The rank of regular round
3. Match won 3–0 or 3–1: 3 points for the winner, 0 points for the loser
4. Match won 3–2: 2 points for the winner, 1 point for the loser
5. Match forfeited: 3 points for the winner, 0 points (0–25, 0–25, 0–25) for the loser

=== Standings ===
Pos	Team	W	L	SW	SL	SR	SPW	SPL	SPR	WP	RP	Pts	Qualification
1	Panasonic Panthers	3	2	10	7	1.429	407	376	1.082	9	5	14	Final
2	Toyoda Gosei Trefuerza	3	2	12	7	1.714	443	405	1.094	10	4	14	Final 3
3	JT Thunders	4	1	12	8	1.500	502	475	1.057	11	2	13	Final 3
4	Toray Arrows	4	1	12	9	1.333	433	459	0.943	9	3	12	
5	JTEKT Stings	1	4	7	12	0.583	437	454	0.963	4	0	4	
6	Suntory Sunbirds	0	5	5	15	0.333	421	474	0.888	2	1	3	

=== Results ===
Date	Time		Score		Set 1	Set 2	Set 3	Set 4	Set 5	Total	Report
10 Feb	11:00	Toray Arrows	0–3	Panasonic Panthers	14–25	20–25	17–25			51–75	
10 Feb	13:10	JTEKT Stings	0–3	Toyoda Gosei Trefuerza	16–25	22–25	21–25			59–75	
10 Feb	15:20	JT Thunders	3–2	Suntory Sunbirds	25–27	28–30	25–18	25–22	22–20	125–117	
11 Feb	13:00	JTEKT Stings	1–3	Panasonic Panthers	23–25	25–23	28–30	12–25		88–103	
11 Feb	15:45	Toray Arrows	3–2	Toyoda Gosei Trefuerza	22–25	19–25	25–22	25–23	15–13	106–108	
17 Feb	11:00	Panasonic Panthers	3–0	Suntory Sunbirds	25–22	25–17	25–19			75–58	
17 Feb	13:00	JT Thunders	3–1	Toyoda Gosei Trefuerza	25–21	21–25	25–23	25–16		96–85	
17 Feb	15:30	Toray Arrows	3–2	JTEKT Stings	25–22	26–24	15–25	15–25	15–6	96–102	
18 Feb	13:00	JT Thunders	3–1	Panasonic Panthers	24–26	25–16	25–19	25–23		99–84	
18 Feb	15:40	Suntory Sunbirds	1–3	Toyoda Gosei Trefuerza	17–25	25–20	18–25	14–25		74–95	
24 Feb	11:00	Panasonic Panthers	0–3	Toyoda Gosei Trefuerza	24–26	19–25	27–29			70–80	
24 Feb	13:15	JT Thunders	0–3	Toray Arrows	23–25	24–26	23–25			70–76	
24 Feb	15:25	JTEKT Stings	3–0	Suntory Sunbirds	25–23	25–23	25–22			75–68	
25 Feb	13:00	Toray Arrows	3–2	Suntory Sunbirds	26–24	18–25	25–14	17–25	18–16	104–104	
25 Feb	11:00	JT Thunders	3–1	JTEKT Stings	30–28	28–26	18–25	36–34		112–113	

== Final Round ==
=== Final 3 ===
Team 1	Agg.	Team 2	1st leg	2nd leg
JT Thunders (Japan)	4–4^{1}	(Japan) Toyoda Gosei Trefuerza	3–1	1–3

Date	Time		Score		Set 1	Set 2	Set 3	Set 4	Set 5	Total	Report
3 Mar	15:35	JT Thunders	3–1	Toyoda Gosei Trefuerza	25–21	20–25	25–23	25–23		95–92	
4 Mar	14:25	JT Thunders	1–3	Toyoda Gosei Trefuerza	25–27	16–25	25–22	16–25		82–99	
Golden set		JT Thunders	24–26	Toyoda Gosei Trefuerza							

^{1}Toyoda Gosei Trefuerza won the golden set 26–24

=== Final ===
Final 3					Final
					1	Panasonic Panthers	3	3	6
3	JT Thunders	3	1	4	2	Toyoda Gosei Trefuerza	0	2	2
2	Toyoda Gosei Trefuerza	1	3	4

Team 1	Agg.	Team 2	1st leg	2nd leg
Panasonic Panthers (Japan)	6–2	(Japan) Toyoda Gosei Trefuerza	3–0	3–2

Date	Time		Score		Set 1	Set 2	Set 3	Set 4	Set 5	Total	Report
10 Mar	14:00	Panasonic Panthers	3–0	Toyoda Gosei Trefuerza	25–19	25–21	25–20			75–60	
18 Mar	15:10	Panasonic Panthers	3–2	Toyoda Gosei Trefuerza	19–25	25–16	24–26	26–24	15–13	109–104	

== Final standing ==
Rank	Team
1st place, gold medalist(s)	Panasonic Panthers
2nd place, silver medalist(s)	Toyoda Gosei Trefuerza
3rd place, bronze medalist(s)	JT Thunders
4	Toray Arrows
5	JTEKT Stings
6	Suntory Sunbirds
7	Osaka Blazers Sakai
8	FC Tokyo

Qualified for the 2019 Asian Men's Club Volleyball Championship

2017–18 V.Premier League Men's Champions
Panasonic Panthers
5th title

== See also ==
- 2017–18 V.Premier League Women's
