= Trent O'Dea =

Australian volleyball player (born 1994)

Personal information
- Nationality: Australian
- Born: 11 May 1994 (age 32)
- Height: 201 cm (6 ft 7 in)
- Weight: 98 kg (216 lb)
- Spike: 354 cm (139 in)
- Block: 344 cm (135 in)

Volleyball information
- Current club: VC Nagano Tridents
- Number: 8 (national team)

Career
- Years: Team
- 2015 2023 - present: LinkopingVolleyball Club; VC Nagano Tridents

National team
- Years: Team
- 2015: Australia

Trent O'Dea (born 11 May 1994) is an Australian male volleyball player. He is part of the Australia men's national volleyball team. On club level he plays for VC Nagano Tridents, a Japanese Club currently in Division One of Japan volleyball league.
