= Árpád Baróti =

Hungarian volleyball player (born 1991)

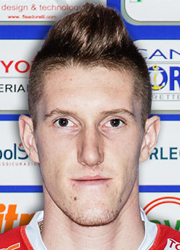

Personal information
- Nationality: Hungarian
- Born: 23 October 1991 (age 35) Bonyhád, Hungary
- Height: 2.06 m (6 ft 9 in)
- Weight: 92 kg (203 lb)
- Spike: 360 cm (142 in)
- Block: 340 cm (134 in)

Volleyball information
- Position: Opposite

Career
- Years: Team
- 2008–2010 2010–2011 2011–2013 2013–2014 2014–2015 2015–2016 2016–2017 2017–2018 2018–2019 2019–2020 2020 2020–2021 2021 2021–2022: Dunaferr SE; Volley Callipo; Volley Milano; Ansan Rush&Cash Vespid; Città di Castello; Berlin Recycling Volleys; Suwon KEPCO Vixtorm; Hyundai Capital Skywalkers; Narbonne Volley; ZAKSA Kędzierzyn-Koźle; Bursa BBSK; Tourcoing LM; Suntory Sunbirds; Jastrzębski Węgiel

National team
- Years: Team
- 2012–: Hungary

Árpád Baróti (born 23 October 1991) is a Hungarian professional volleyball player, a member of the Hungary national team.

== Honours ==
- CEV Cup
  - 2015/2016 – with Berlin Recycling Volleys
- National championships
  - 2015/2016 German Championship, with Berlin Recycling Volleys
  - 2015/2016 German Cup, with Berlin Recycling Volleys
  - 2016/2017 KOVO Cup, with Suwon KEPCO Vixtorm
  - 2019/2020 Polish SuperCup, with ZAKSA Kędzierzyn-Koźle
