= Suntory Sunbirds =

Japanese men's volleyball club in Osaka

- Founded: 1973; 53 years ago
- Ground: Suntory Training Center; Minoh City, Osaka, Japan; Asue Arena Osaka; Minato, Osaka City, Osaka, Japan (Capacity: 10,000)
- Chairman: (Japan) Kurihara Keisuke
- Team Manager Head Coach: (Japan) Nishida Hiroki (France) Olivier Lecat
- Captain: (Japan) Taishi Onodera
- League: SV.League
- 2025–26: Runner-Up
- Website: Club home page

Uniforms
Home	Away

Suntory Sunbirds (サントリー・サンバーズ, Santorī Sanbāzu) is a men's volleyball team based in Osaka City, Osaka, Japan. The club was founded in 1973 and plays in the SV.League. The owner of the club is Suntory.

== History ==
In 2023, Suntory Sunbirds beat Indonesia's Bhayangkara in the final to become the first Japanese club to win the Asian Men's Club Volleyball Championship title.

== Honours ==
=== International ===
- FIVB Volleyball Men's Club World Championship

(×1): 2023

- Asian Men's Club Volleyball Championship

(×1): 2023
(×2): 2001, 2022
(×2): 2008, 2025

=== Domestic ===
- Japan Volleyball League/V.League/V.Premier League/V.League Division 1

(×10): 1994–1995, 1999–2000, 2000–2001, 2001–2002, 2002–2003, 2003–2004, 2006–2007, 2020–2021, 2021–2022, 2023–2024
(×6): 1984–1985, 1990–1991, 2005–2006, 2010–2011, 2014–2015, 2022–2023
(×1): 2011–2012

- SV.League

(×1): 2024–2025
(×1): 2025–2026

- Kurowashiki All Japan Volleyball Championship

(×6): 1979, 1985, 1991, 1995, 2000, 2022
(×4): 1986, 1992, 1999, 2023

- Emperor's Cup

(×2): 2010, 2024

== Current Roster ==
The following is the team roster as of Season 2026–27.

No.	Name	Date of Birth	Height	Position	Years with Team	Previous Team	Notes
1	(Japan) Taishi Onodera (c)	February 27, 1996 (age 30)	2.02 m (6 ft 8 in)	Middle Blocker	2023–	(Japan) JT Hiroshima	
2	(Japan) Kenji Sato	January 16, 1997 (age 29)	1.96 m (6 ft 5 in)	Middle Blocker	2019–	Tokai University	
5	(Japan) Ryo Shimokawa	January 12, 2000 (age 26)	1.78 m (5 ft 10 in)	Setter	2024–	(Japan) VC Nagano Tridents	
7	(Argentina) Luciano Palonsky	July 8, 1999 (age 27)	1.98 m (6 ft 6 in)	Outside Hitter	2026–	(Turkey) İstanbul Gençlik Spor Kulübü	Transfer
8	(Japan) Masahiro Sekita	November 20, 1993 (age 32)	1.76 m (5 ft 9 in)	Setter	2025–	(Japan) JTEKT Stings	
9	(Chinese Taipei) Pei-Cheng Tsai	January 2, 2001 (age 25)	2.00 m (6 ft 7 in)	Middle Blocker	2026–	(Japan) Nippon Steel Sakai Blazers	Transfer
10	(Tunisia) Wassim Ben Tara	August 3, 1996 (age 30)	2.03 m (6 ft 8 in)	Opposite Hitter	2026–	(Italy) Sir Sircoma Monini Perugia	Transfer
14	(Japan) Ren Oniki	August 28, 2000 (age 26)	2.04 m (6 ft 8 in)	Middle Blocker	2023–	Nippon Sport Science University	
15	(Japan) Yoshimitsu Kiire	May 13, 1995 (age 31)	1.74 m (5 ft 9 in)	Libero	2018–	Waseda University	Vice Captain
17	(Japan) Kazuma Sonae	January 6, 1998 (age 28)	1.67 m (5 ft 6 in)	Libero	2026–	(Poland) InPost ChKS Chełm	Transfer
18	(Russia) Egor Kliuka	June 15, 1995 (age 31)	2.09 m (6 ft 10 in)	Outside Hitter	2025–	(Russia) Zenit Saint Petersburg	
19	(Japan) Kotaro Kai	November 5, 2001 (age 24)	1.87 m (6 ft 2 in)	Opposite Hitter	2023–	Senshu University	
20	(Japan) Hikaru Someno	July 3, 2001 (age 25)	1.85 m (6 ft 1 in)	Outside Hitter	2023–2025; 2026–	(Japan) Voreas Hokkaido	Return
21	(Japan) Rui Takahashi	January 14, 2000 (age 26)	1.86 m (6 ft 1 in)	Outside Hitter	2022–	Nihon University	
22	(Japan) Kenshin Kuwada	June 28, 1999 (age 27)	1.90 m (6 ft 3 in)	Outside Hitter	2022–2024; 2025–	(Japan) Voreas Hokkaido	
23	(Japan) Tatsuki Kashiwada	November 9, 1997 (age 28)	1.92 m (6 ft 4 in)	Middle Blocker	2022–	(Japan) Voreas Hokkaido	
61	(Japan) Yamato Nakano	October 2, 1999 (age 27)	1.79 m (5 ft 10 in)	Setter	2026–	(Poland) Barkom-Każany Lwów	Transfer
99	(Romania) Daniel Chitigoi	March 10, 2005 (age 21)	2.03 m (6 ft 8 in)	Outside Hitter	2026–	(Poland) PGE GiEK Skra Bełchatów	Transfer
Head Coach: (France) Olivier Lecat
Sources: Team official announcements, team official website, V.League official website Updated: September 4, 2026

Position abbreviations: S = Setter, OH = Outside Hitter, OP = Opposite, MB = Middle Blocker, L = Libero

== Former Roster ==
Team Roster – Season 2025–26
No.	Name	Date of Birth	Height	Position
1	(Japan) Taishi Onodera	February 27, 1996 (age 30)	2.02 m (6 ft 8 in)	Middle Blocker
2	(Japan) Kenji Sato	January 16, 1997 (age 29)	1.96 m (6 ft 5 in)	Middle Blocker
5	(Japan) Ryo Shimokawa	January 12, 2000 (age 26)	1.78 m (5 ft 10 in)	Setter
7	(Cuba) Alain De Armas	March 4, 2001 (age 25)	1.90 m (6 ft 3 in)	Outside Hitter
8	(Japan) Masahiro Sekita	November 20, 1993 (age 32)	1.76 m (5 ft 9 in)	Setter
10	(Japan) Tomohiro Ogawa	July 4, 1996 (age 30)	1.76 m (5 ft 9 in)	Libero
11	(Japan) Soshi Fujinaka	December 2, 1999 (age 26)	1.77 m (5 ft 10 in)	Libero
12	(Japan) Ran Takahashi (c)	September 2, 2001 (age 25)	1.88 m (6 ft 2 in)	Outside Hitter
13	(Russia) Dmitry Muserskiy	October 29, 1988 (age 37)	2.18 m (7 ft 2 in)	Opposite Hitter
14	(Japan) Ren Oniki	August 28, 2000 (age 26)	2.04 m (6 ft 8 in)	Middle Blocker
15	(Japan) Yoshimitsu Kiire	May 13, 1995 (age 31)	1.74 m (5 ft 9 in)	Libero
17	(Japan) Hirohito Kashimura	January 15, 1999 (age 27)	1.96 m (6 ft 5 in)	Middle Blocker
18	(Russia) Egor Kliuka	June 15, 1995 (age 31)	2.09 m (6 ft 10 in)	Outside Hitter
19	(Japan) Kotaro Kai	November 5, 2001 (age 24)	1.87 m (6 ft 2 in)	Opposite Hitter
21	(Japan) Rui Takahashi	January 14, 2000 (age 26)	1.86 m (6 ft 1 in)	Outside Hitter
22	(Japan) Kenshin Kuwada	June 28, 1999 (age 27)	1.90 m (6 ft 3 in)	Outside Hitter
23	(Japan) Tatsuki Kashiwada	November 9, 1997 (age 28)	1.92 m (6 ft 4 in)	Middle Blocker
Head Coach: (France) Olivier Lecat

Team Roster – Season 2024–25
No.	Name	Date of Birth	Height	Position
1	(Japan) Taishi Onodera	February 27, 1996 (age 30)	2.02 m (6 ft 8 in)	Middle Blocker
2	(Japan) Kenji Sato	January 16, 1997 (age 29)	1.96 m (6 ft 5 in)	Middle Blocker
4	(Japan) Atomu Torikai	April 6, 1996 (age 30)	1.95 m (6 ft 5 in)	Opposite Hitter
5	(Japan) Ryo Shimokawa	January 12, 2000 (age 26)	1.78 m (5 ft 10 in)	Setter
7	(Cuba) Alain De Armas	March 4, 2001 (age 25)	1.90 m (6 ft 3 in)	Outside Hitter
8	(Japan) Soshi Fujinaka	December 2, 1999 (age 26)	1.77 m (5 ft 10 in)	Libero
9	(Japan) Masaki Oya	April 23, 1995 (age 31)	1.77 m (5 ft 10 in)	Setter
10	(Japan) Kenya Fujinaka (c)	July 25, 1993 (age 33)	1.90 m (6 ft 3 in)	Outside Hitter
11	(Poland) Aleksander Śliwka	May 24, 1995 (age 31)	1.98 m (6 ft 6 in)	Outside Hitter
12	(Japan) Ran Takahashi	September 2, 2001 (age 25)	1.88 m (6 ft 2 in)	Outside Hitter
13	(Russia) Dmitry Muserskiy	October 29, 1988 (age 37)	2.18 m (7 ft 2 in)	Opposite Hitter
14	(Japan) Ren Oniki	August 28, 2000 (age 26)	2.04 m (6 ft 8 in)	Middle Blocker
15	(Japan) Yoshimitsu Kiire	May 13, 1995 (age 31)	1.74 m (5 ft 9 in)	Libero
17	(Japan) Hirohito Kashimura	January 15, 1999 (age 27)	1.96 m (6 ft 5 in)	Middle Blocker
18	(Japan) Hikaru Someno	July 3, 2001 (age 25)	1.85 m (6 ft 1 in)	Outside Hitter
19	(Japan) Kotaro Kai	November 5, 2001 (age 24)	1.87 m (6 ft 2 in)	Opposite Hitter
20	(Japan) Hiroki Nishida	August 15, 1997 (age 29)	1.80 m (5 ft 11 in)	Setter
21	(Japan) Rui Takahashi	January 14, 2000 (age 26)	1.86 m (6 ft 1 in)	Outside Hitter
23	(Japan) Tatsuki Kashiwada	November 9, 1997 (age 28)	1.92 m (6 ft 4 in)	Middle Blocker
Head Coach: (France) Olivier Lecat

Team Roster – Season 2023–24
No.	Name	Date of Birth	Height	Position
1	(Japan) Taishi Onodera	February 27, 1996 (age 30)	2.02 m (6 ft 8 in)	Middle Blocker
2	(Japan) Yuito Takahashi	May 23, 1997 (age 29)	1.73 m (5 ft 8 in)	Libero
4	(Japan) Atomu Torikai	April 6, 1996 (age 30)	1.95 m (6 ft 5 in)	Opposite Hitter
6	(China) Yu Yuantai	December 3, 1997 (age 28)	1.86 m (6 ft 1 in)	Outside Hitter
7	(Cuba) Alain De Armas	March 4, 2001 (age 25)	1.90 m (6 ft 3 in)	Outside Hitter
8	(Japan) Soshi Fujinaka	December 2, 1999 (age 26)	1.77 m (5 ft 10 in)	Libero
9	(Japan) Masaki Oya (c)	April 23, 1995 (age 31)	1.77 m (5 ft 10 in)	Setter
10	(Japan) Kenya Fujinaka	July 25, 1993 (age 33)	1.90 m (6 ft 3 in)	Outside Hitter
12	(Japan) Kenji Sato	January 16, 1997 (age 29)	1.96 m (6 ft 5 in)	Middle Blocker
13	(Russia) Dmitry Muserskiy	October 29, 1988 (age 37)	2.18 m (7 ft 2 in)	Opposite Hitter
14	(Japan) Ren Oniki	August 28, 2000 (age 26)	2.04 m (6 ft 8 in)	Middle Blocker
15	(Japan) Yoshimitsu Kiire	May 13, 1995 (age 31)	1.74 m (5 ft 9 in)	Libero
17	(Japan) Hirohito Kashimura	January 15, 1999 (age 27)	1.96 m (6 ft 5 in)	Middle Blocker
18	(Japan) Hikaru Someno	July 3, 2001 (age 25)	1.85 m (6 ft 1 in)	Outside Hitter
19	(Japan) Kotaro Kai	November 5, 2001 (age 24)	1.87 m (6 ft 2 in)	Opposite Hitter
20	(Japan) Hiroki Nishida	August 15, 1997 (age 29)	1.80 m (5 ft 11 in)	Setter
21	(Japan) Rui Takahashi	January 14, 2000 (age 26)	1.86 m (6 ft 1 in)	Outside Hitter
22	(Japan) Kenshin Kuwada	June 28, 1999 (age 27)	1.90 m (6 ft 3 in)	Outside Hitter
23	(Japan) Tatsuki Kashiwada	November 9, 1997 (age 28)	1.92 m (6 ft 4 in)	Middle Blocker
Head Coach: (Japan) Kota Yamamura

Team Roster – Season 2022–23
No.	Name	Date of Birth	Height	Position
2	(Japan) Yuito Takahashi	May 23, 1997 (age 29)	1.73 m (5 ft 8 in)	Libero
3	(Japan) Haruki Ono	October 27, 1995 (age 30)	1.87 m (6 ft 2 in)	Middle Blocker
4	(Japan) Atomu Torikai	April 6, 1996 (age 30)	1.95 m (6 ft 5 in)	Opposite Hitter
5	(Japan) Ryu Yamamoto	September 23, 2000 (age 26)	1.85 m (6 ft 1 in)	Setter
6	(China) Shikun Peng	August 26, 2000 (age 26)	2.10 m (6 ft 11 in)	Middle Blocker
7	(Cuba) Alain De Armas	March 4, 2001 (age 25)	1.90 m (6 ft 3 in)	Outside Hitter
8	(Japan) Soshi Fujinaka	December 2, 1999 (age 26)	1.77 m (5 ft 10 in)	Libero
9	(Japan) Masaki Oya (c)	April 23, 1995 (age 31)	1.77 m (5 ft 10 in)	Setter
10	(Japan) Kenya Fujinaka	July 25, 1993 (age 33)	1.90 m (6 ft 3 in)	Outside Hitter
11	(Japan) Kosuke Hata	July 15, 1995 (age 31)	1.91 m (6 ft 3 in)	Outside Hitter
12	(Japan) Kenji Sato	January 16, 1997 (age 29)	1.96 m (6 ft 5 in)	Middle Blocker
13	(Russia) Dmitry Muserskiy	October 29, 1988 (age 37)	2.18 m (7 ft 2 in)	Opposite Hitter
14	(Japan) Ren Oniki	August 28, 2000 (age 26)	2.04 m (6 ft 8 in)	Middle Blocker
15	(Japan) Yoshimitsu Kiire	May 13, 1995 (age 31)	1.74 m (5 ft 9 in)	Libero
18	(Japan) Takeshi Ogawa	July 7, 1994 (age 32)	1.93 m (6 ft 4 in)	Middle Blocker
19	(Japan) Masashi Kuriyama	July 14, 1988 (age 38)	1.89 m (6 ft 2 in)	Outside Hitter
20	(Japan) Hiroki Nishida	August 15, 1997 (age 29)	1.80 m (5 ft 11 in)	Setter
21	(Japan) Rui Takahashi	January 14, 2000 (age 26)	1.86 m (6 ft 1 in)	Outside Hitter
22	(Japan) Kenshin Kuwada	June 28, 1999 (age 27)	1.90 m (6 ft 3 in)	Outside Hitter
23	(Japan) Tatsuki Kashiwada	November 9, 1997 (age 28)	1.92 m (6 ft 4 in)	Middle Blocker
Head Coach: (Japan) Kota Yamamura

Team Roster – Season 2021–22
No.	Name	Date of Birth	Height	Position
1	(Japan) Taiki Tsuruda	July 13, 1991 (age 35)	1.77 m (5 ft 10 in)	Libero
2	(Japan) Yuito Takahashi	May 23, 1997 (age 29)	1.73 m (5 ft 8 in)	Libero
3	(Japan) Haruki Ono	October 27, 1995 (age 30)	1.87 m (6 ft 2 in)	Middle Blocker
5	(Japan) Kentaro Matsubayashi	October 8, 1994 (age 32)	1.85 m (6 ft 1 in)	Outside Hitter
6	(China) Shikun Peng	August 26, 2000 (age 26)	2.10 m (6 ft 11 in)	Middle Blocker
7	(Cuba) Alain De Armas	March 4, 2001 (age 25)	1.90 m (6 ft 3 in)	Outside Hitter
8	(Japan) Masahiro Yanagida	July 6, 1992 (age 34)	1.86 m (6 ft 1 in)	Outside Hitter
9	(Japan) Masaki Oya (c)	April 23, 1995 (age 31)	1.77 m (5 ft 10 in)	Setter
10	(Japan) Kenya Fujinaka	July 25, 1993 (age 33)	1.90 m (6 ft 3 in)	Outside Hitter
11	(Japan) Kosuke Hata	July 15, 1995 (age 31)	1.91 m (6 ft 3 in)	Outside Hitter
12	(Japan) Kenji Sato	January 16, 1997 (age 29)	1.96 m (6 ft 5 in)	Middle Blocker
13	(Russia) Dmitry Muserskiy	October 29, 1988 (age 37)	2.18 m (7 ft 2 in)	Opposite Hitter
14	(Japan) Hisanori Kato	April 7, 1994 (age 32)	1.93 m (6 ft 4 in)	Middle Blocker
15	(Japan) Yoshimitsu Kiire	May 13, 1995 (age 31)	1.74 m (5 ft 9 in)	Libero
17	(Japan) Hirohito Kashimura	January 15, 1999 (age 27)	1.96 m (6 ft 5 in)	Middle Blocker
18	(Japan) Takeshi Ogawa	July 7, 1994 (age 32)	1.93 m (6 ft 4 in)	Middle Blocker
19	(Japan) Masashi Kuriyama	July 14, 1988 (age 38)	1.89 m (6 ft 2 in)	Outside Hitter
20	(Japan) Hiroki Nishida	August 15, 1997 (age 29)	1.80 m (5 ft 11 in)	Setter
21	(Japan) Rui Takahashi	January 14, 2000 (age 26)	1.86 m (6 ft 1 in)	Outside Hitter
22	(Japan) Kenshin Kuwada	June 28, 1999 (age 27)	1.90 m (6 ft 3 in)	Outside Hitter
23	(Japan) Tatsuki Kashiwada	November 9, 1997 (age 28)	1.92 m (6 ft 4 in)	Middle Blocker
91	(Hungary) Árpád Baróti	October 23, 1991 (age 35)	2.06 m (6 ft 9 in)	Opposite Hitter
Head Coach: (Japan) Kota Yamamura

Team Roster – Season 2020–21
No.	Name	Date of Birth	Height	Position
1	(Japan) Taiki Tsuruda	July 13, 1991 (age 35)	1.77 m (5 ft 10 in)	Libero
3	(Japan) Haruki Ono	October 27, 1995 (age 30)	1.87 m (6 ft 2 in)	Middle Blocker
4	(Japan) Atomu Torikai	April 6, 1996 (age 30)	1.95 m (6 ft 5 in)	Outside Hitter
5	(Japan) Kentaro Matsubayashi	October 8, 1994 (age 32)	1.85 m (6 ft 1 in)	Outside Hitter
6	(China) Daoshuai Ji	February 7, 1992 (age 34)	1.95 m (6 ft 5 in)	Outside Hitter
7	(Cuba) Alain De Armas	March 4, 2001 (age 25)	1.90 m (6 ft 3 in)	Outside Hitter
8	(Japan) Masahiro Yanagida	July 6, 1992 (age 34)	1.86 m (6 ft 1 in)	Outside Hitter
9	(Japan) Masaki Oya (c)	April 23, 1995 (age 31)	1.77 m (5 ft 10 in)	Setter
10	(Japan) Kenya Fujinaka	July 25, 1993 (age 33)	1.90 m (6 ft 3 in)	Outside Hitter
11	(Japan) Kosuke Hata	July 15, 1995 (age 31)	1.91 m (6 ft 3 in)	Outside Hitter
12	(Japan) Tatsuya Shiota	November 17, 1989 (age 36)	1.92 m (6 ft 4 in)	Middle Blocker
13	(Russia) Dmitry Muserskiy	October 29, 1988 (age 37)	2.18 m (7 ft 2 in)	Opposite Hitter
14	(Japan) Hisanori Kato	April 7, 1994 (age 32)	1.93 m (6 ft 4 in)	Middle Blocker
15	(Japan) Yoshimitsu Kiire	May 13, 1995 (age 31)	1.74 m (5 ft 9 in)	Libero
17	(Japan) Hirohito Kashimura	January 15, 1999 (age 27)	1.96 m (6 ft 5 in)	Middle Blocker
18	(Japan) Takeshi Ogawa	July 7, 1994 (age 32)	1.93 m (6 ft 4 in)	Middle Blocker
19	(Japan) Masashi Kuriyama	July 14, 1988 (age 38)	1.89 m (6 ft 2 in)	Outside Hitter
20	(Japan) Hiroki Nishida	August 15, 1997 (age 29)	1.80 m (5 ft 11 in)	Setter
21	(Japan) Kenji Sato	January 16, 1997 (age 29)	1.96 m (6 ft 5 in)	Middle Blocker
22	(Japan) Yuito Takahashi	May 23, 1997 (age 29)	1.73 m (5 ft 8 in)	Libero
23	(Japan) Tatsuki Kashiwada	November 9, 1997 (age 28)	1.92 m (6 ft 4 in)	Middle Blocker
Head Coach: (Japan) Kota Yamamura

== League Results ==
Champion Runner-Up

League		Position	Teams	Matches	Wins	Losses
Japan National Corporate League
Japan National Corporate League	1974–75	Runner-Up	6	10	6	4
All Japan Volleyball Selection Men's League (Japan Volleyball League)	1975–76	4th	6	10	3	7
All Japan Volleyball Selection Men's League (Japan Volleyball League)	1976–77	6th	6	12	1	11
Japan National Corporate League
Japan National Corporate League	1977–78	Champion	6	10	9	1
Japan National Corporate League	1978–79	Champion	6	10	9	1
All Japan Volleyball Selection Men's League (Japan Volleyball League)	1979–80	4th	6	10	3	7
All Japan Volleyball Selection Men's League (Japan Volleyball League)	1980–81	7th	8	16	5	11
All Japan Volleyball Selection Men's League (Japan Volleyball League)	1981–82	5th	8	21	10	11
All Japan Volleyball Selection Men's League (Japan Volleyball League)	1982–83	4th	8	21	11	10
All Japan Volleyball Selection Men's League (Japan Volleyball League)	1983–84	4th	8	21	13	8
All Japan Volleyball Selection Men's League (Japan Volleyball League)	1984–85	Runner-Up	8	21	16	5
All Japan Volleyball Selection Men's League (Japan Volleyball League)	1985–86	3rd	8	21	13	8
All Japan Volleyball Selection Men's League (Japan Volleyball League)	1986–87	5th	8	21	7	14
All Japan Volleyball Selection Men's League (Japan Volleyball League)	1987–88	5th	8	14	5	9
All Japan Volleyball Selection Men's League (Japan Volleyball League)	1988–89	7th	8	16	5	11
All Japan Volleyball Selection Men's League (Japan Volleyball League)	1989–90	5th	8	14	8	6
All Japan Volleyball Selection Men's League (Japan Volleyball League)	1990–91	Runner-Up	8	17	10	7
All Japan Volleyball Selection Men's League (Japan Volleyball League)	1991–92	3rd	8	20	10	10
All Japan Volleyball Selection Men's League (Japan Volleyball League)	1992–93	7th	8	16	5	11
All Japan Volleyball Selection Men's League (Japan Volleyball League)	1993–94	4th	8	20	8	12
V.League
V.League	1994–95	Champion	8	21	14	7
V.League	1995–96	4th	8	21	14	7
V.League	1996–97	3rd	8	21	12	9
V.League	1997–98	4th	8	21	12	9
V.League	1998–99	3rd	10	18	14	4
V.League	1999–00	Champion	10	18	14	4
V.League	2000–01	Champion	10	18	14	4
V.League	2001–02	Champion	10	18	11	7
V.League	2002–03	Champion	8	21	13	8
V.League	2003–04	Champion	8	21	11	10
V.League	2004–05	5th	8	28	14	14
V.League	2005–06	Runner-Up	8	28	20	8
V.Premier League
V.Premier League	2006–07	Champion	8	28	23	5
V.Premier League	2007–08	3rd	8	28	24	4
V.Premier League	2008–09	4th	8	28	22	6
V.Premier League	2009–10	5th	8	28	15	13
V.Premier League	2010–11	Runner-Up	8	24	18	6
V.Premier League	2011–12	3rd	8	21	10	11
V.Premier League	2012–13	4th	8	28	24	4
V.Premier League	2013–14	6th	8	28	11	17
V.Premier League	2014–15	Runner-Up	8	21	16	5
V.Premier League	2015–16	7th	8	21	9	12
V.Premier League	2016–17	4th	8	21	13	8
V.Premier League	2017–18	5th	8	21	8	13
V.League Division 1	2018–19	4th	10	32	21	11
V.League Division 1	2019–20	3rd	10	30	20	10
V.League Division 1	2020–21	Champion	10	36	33	3
V.League Division 1	2021–22	Champion	10	38	29	9
V.League Division 1	2022–23	Runner-Up	10	40	28	12
V.League Division 1	2023–24	Champion	10	38	32	6
SV.League
SV.League	2024–25	Champion	10	49	40	9
SV.League	2025–26	Runner-Up	10	49	43	6
