= Cignal HD Spikers =

Cignal HD Spikers or Super Spikers may refer to:

- Cignal HD Spikers (men), Filipino men's volleyball team
- Cignal HD Spikers (women), Filipino women's volleyball team
- Cignal, a name used by the Philippines national volleyball teams in AVC and FIVB club tournaments

== See also ==
- Cignal, Philippine media company
