= Shinshu Matsumoto Tridents =

Japanese men's volleyball club

- Founded: 2008
- Chairman: Seiya Sasagawa
- Manager: Shinji Kawamura
- Captain: Kota Ikeda
- League: SV.League
- 2025–26: 10th
- Website: Club home page

Uniforms
Home	Away

Shinshu Matsumoto Tridents (信州松本トライデンツ), formerly the VC Nagano Tridents (VC長野トライデンツ) is a Japanese men's volleyball team based in Nagano prefecture. Currently it competes in the SV.League, the highest volleyball league in Japan.

== History ==
VC Nagano Tridents was founded in April 2008, the original name is VC Nagano Growth. They changed team's name into VC Nagano Trident in April 2010. In 2015, they participated in V Challenge League II. A year later, they won the title of V Challenge League II and promoted to V Challenge League I.

In 2018, they were eligible to compete in V. League Division 1 due to V.League expansion.

In 2022, VC Nagano Trident as the first team in V.League to launch "Token" programme in order to support their team's activities.

In July 2023, it was announced that Melco Group would acquire the whole club as the club was facing bankruptcy in August. There were no changes in the employment and business continuity of the employees belonging to VC Nagano Tridents and the continuation of the competitions belonging to VC Nagano Tridents. The new company rebuilt the management to enter the SV League under the new system.

On July 1, 2026, the team rebranded as the Shinsu Matsumoto Tridents.

== Team ==
=== Current roster ===
As of November 2026:

Team roster – season 2026/2027
No.	Player Name	Position	Date of birth	Height
1	(Japan) Yoshihiko Matsumoto	Middle Blocker	7 January 1981 (age 45)	1.93 m (6 ft 4 in)
2	(United States) Zachary Rama	Outside Hitter	12 July 2004 (age 22)	2.02 m (6 ft 8 in)
3	(Japan) Shusuke Sakai	Opposite Hitter	20 May 2002 (age 24)	1.80 m (5 ft 11 in)
4	(Japan) Kanze Chiba	Middle Blocker	18 August 2003 (age 23)	1.91 m (6 ft 3 in)
6	(Japan) Shinjo Akahoshi	Setter	19 January 2000 (age 26)	1.80 m (5 ft 11 in)
8	(Germany) Filip John	Opposite Hitter	1 August 2001 (age 25)	2.05 m (6 ft 9 in)
9	(Japan) Shota Fujiwara	Outside Hitter	14 July 1998 (age 28)	1.90 m (6 ft 3 in)
10	(Japan) Dai Yasuhara	Middle Blocker	14 August 2001 (age 25)	1.90 m (6 ft 3 in)
11	(Japan) Yuji Kudo	Outside Hitter	24 September 2001 (age 25)	1.90 m (6 ft 3 in)
12	(Japan) Yusuke Hoshina	Setter	4 January 2001 (age 25)	1.80 m (5 ft 11 in)
14	(Japan) Keisuke Matsuo	Libero	28 July 1996 (age 30)	1.70 m (5 ft 7 in)
15	(United States) David Smith	Middle Blocker	15 May 1985 (age 41)	2.00 m (6 ft 7 in)
17	(Japan) Hiroki Ito	Setter	26 June 1999 (age 27)	1.90 m (6 ft 3 in)
18	(Japan) Ryuya Sato	Outside Hitter	3 August 2001 (age 25)	1.93 m (6 ft 4 in)
19	(Japan) Takamaru Ichijo	Outside Hitter	24 August 2002 (age 24)	1.88 m (6 ft 2 in)
20	(Japan) McRaven DiAeris	Middle Blocker	13 May 2002 (age 24)	1.95 m (6 ft 5 in)
21	(Japan) Hazuki Kishikawa	Opposite Hitter	7 September 2002 (age 24)	1.94 m (6 ft 4 in)
24	(Japan) Shodai Abe	Middle Blocker	3 November 1999 (age 27)	1.90 m (6 ft 3 in)
Head coach: (Germany) Thomas Ranner

=== Former roster ===
Team roster – Season 2023/24
No.	Player Name	Date of birth	Position
1	(Japan) Koki Yamada	October 7, 1999 (age 27)	Middle Blocker
2	(Japan) Shohei Ono	April 25, 1999 (age 27)	Outside Hitter
3	(Japan) Sota Ikeda	October 8, 1998 (age 28)	Outside/Opposite Hitter
4	(Japan) Nakano Ryu	August 28, 1998 (age 28)	Outside Hitter
5	(Japan) Ryo Shimokawa	January 12, 2000 (age 26)	Setter
6	(China) Xiu Chengcheng	August 23, 1999 (age 27)	Outside Hitter
7	(Japan) Hiroki Koto	April 14, 2000 (age 26)	Libero
9	(Japan) Shota Fujiwara	July 14, 1998 (age 28)	Outside Hitter
12	(Japan) Kazuma Sonae	January 6, 1998 (age 28)	Libero
13	(Japan) Meguru Tsubaki	February 2, 1995 (age 31)	Setter
14	(Japan) Ryoma Yanuki	December 24, 1995	Middle Blocker
15	(Japan) Taihei Hazama	April 8, 1997 (age 29)	Middle Blocker
16	(Australia) Trent O'Dea	May 11, 1994 (age 32)	Middle Blocker
17	(Japan) Keito Nakamura	July 15, 1999 (age 27)	Outside Hitter
22	(Japan) Taiga Itoyama	January 12, 2001 (age 25)	Setter
Head coach: (Japan) Shinji Kawamura

Team roster – Season 2022/23
No.	Player Name	Date of birth	Position
1	(Japan) Koki Yamada	October 7, 1999 (age 27)	Middle Blocker
2	(Japan) Yusuke Sugai	September 10, 1997 (age 29)	Opposite Hitter
3	(Japan) Sota Ikeda	October 8, 1998 (age 28)	Outside/Oppostie Hitter
4	(Japan) Nakano Ryu	August 28, 1998 (age 28)	Outside Hitter
5	(Japan) Ryo Shimokawa	January 12, 2000 (age 26)	Setter
6	(Japan) Tatsuki Ito	January 2, 1998 (age 28)	Outside Hitter
8	(Cuba) Carlos Alberto Araujo	April 29, 1992 (age 34)	Oppostie Hitter
9	(Japan) Kota Ikeda (c)	February 8, 1997 (age 29)	Outside Hitter
12	(Japan) Kazuma Sonae	January 6, 1998 (age 28)	Libero
13	(Japan) Meguru Tsubaki	February 2, 1995 (age 31)	Setter
14	(Japan) Ryoma Yanuki	December 24, 1995	Middle Blocker
15	(Japan) Taihei Hazama	April 8, 1997 (age 29)	Middle Blocker
16	(Japan) Kenshi Morisaki	July 25, 1992 (age 34)	Middle Blocker
17	(Japan) Keito Nakamura	July 15, 1999 (age 27)	Outside Hitter
19	(Japan) Hiromasa Miwa	December 17, 1999	Middle Blocker
20	(Indonesia) Doni Haryono	February 21, 1999 (age 27)	Outside Hitter
24	(Japan) Tsubasa Osada	April 30, 1993 (age 33)	Setter
Head coach: (Japan) Shinji Kawamura

== League results ==
Champions Runners-up

League		Position	Teams	Matches	Win	Lose
V.League Division 1	2018–19	10th	10	27	1	26
V.League Division 1	2019–20	10th	10	27	3	24
V.League Division 1	2020–21	9th	10	36	4	32
V.League Division 1	2021–22	10th	10	36	5	31
V.League Division 1	2022–23	9th	10	36	5	31
SV.League	2024-25	9th	10	44	10	34
SV.League	2025-26	10th	10	44	5	39
