= Voreas Hokkaido =

Japanese volleyball club

- Full name: ヴォレアス北海道
- Nickname: Voreas
- Founded: 2016
- Ground: Asahikawa, Hokkaido
- Chairman: Kenshiro Ikeda
- Captain: Sasaki Hiroaki
- League: SV.League
- 2025–26: 9
- Website: Club home page

Uniforms
Home	Away

Voreas Hokkaido is a men's volleyball club in Japan. It currently plays in SV.League. This club is located in Asahikawa city, Hokkaido.

== History ==
Voreas Hokkaido was established in October, 2016. It's Japan's first professional volleyball club.

The club joined V.League on July 1, 2017. Later, the club won the first title of 2017–18 Season of V·Challenge League II.

After the new born V.League, it participated in V.League Division 3 for 2018–19 Season. Voreas Hokkaido managed to win the title and promoted to Division 2 for next season.

Voreas Hokkaido took 2nd place of 2019–20 Season and supposed to take part in V.Challenge match that could be promoted to Division 1 if it won the match. However, the V.Challenge match was suspended due to COVID-19 pandemic.

Voreas Hokkaido won the title of 2021–22 Season V.League Division 2 Men's for the first time. But it failed to promote to Division 1 as they lost the V.Challenge match against VC Nagano Tridents.

Voreas Hokkaido won the 1st place of the 2022–23 season in the V.League Division 2 Men's for the second year in a row with 22 wins and only 2 losses. After winning the V.Challenge match against Oita Miyoshi Weisse Adler, Voreas Hokkaido promoted to Division 1 for the first time for 2023–24 season.

President Kenshiro Ikeda held a press conference on May 29, 2023. In the conference, he expressed the willingness of Voreas Hokkaido that to join the new S-V League which is expected to start its inaugural season in 2024. They have prepared a series of action plan in order to achieve the goal.

== Achievements ==
V.League Division 2

- Champions(1): 2021–22, 2022–23
- Runners-up(1): 2019–20, 2020–21

V.League Division 3/V.Challenge League II

- Champions(1): 2018–19

== Team ==
=== Current roster ===
2026/27 Squad as of November 2026

No.	Player Name	Position	Date of birth	Height
2	(Japan) Manato Nakamichi	Outside Hitter	2 October 2002 (age 24)	1.83 m (6 ft 0 in)
3	(Japan) Takumi Kunikyo	Setter	5 July 2003 (age 23)	1.84 m (6 ft 0 in)
4	(Japan) Hyuga Matsushita	Middle Blocker	17 April 2003 (age 23)	1.98 m (6 ft 6 in)
5	(Japan) Jin Inoue	Middle Blocker	2 April 1992 (age 34)	1.95 m (6 ft 5 in)
6	(Japan) Jun Yamagishi	Setter	3 August 1999 (age 27)	1.86 m (6 ft 1 in)
7	(Ukraine) Nikita Zolotukhin	Opposite Hitter	15 April 2003 (age 23)	2.15 m (7 ft 1 in)
8	(Japan) Kyosuke Higuruma	Outside Hitter	25 September 2002 (age 24)	1.88 m (6 ft 2 in)
9	(Japan) Kota Ikeda	Outside Hitter	8 February 1997 (age 29)	1.80 m (5 ft 11 in)
10	(Estonia) Märt Tammearu	Outside Hitter	17 March 2001 (age 25)	1.98 m (6 ft 6 in)
11	(Japan) Kohei Tonozaki (c)	Libero	28 June 1997 (age 29)	1.72 m (5 ft 8 in)
12	(Japan) Reon Arao	Libero	1 May 2001 (age 25)	1.75 m (5 ft 9 in)
14	(Denmark) Ulrik Dahl	Opposite Hitter	18 November 2000 (age 25)	2.01 m (6 ft 7 in)
17	(Japan) Koki Yamada	Middle Blocker	7 October 1999 (age 27)	1.90 m (6 ft 3 in)
18	(Japan) Koshiro Nishi	Libero	17 March 2003 (age 23)	1.70 m (5 ft 7 in)
19	(Japan) Shota Hamada	Setter	21 September 1990 (age 36)	1.82 m (6 ft 0 in)
34	(Japan) Keisuke Miyoshi	Middle Blocker	16 February 1999 (age 27)	1.90 m (6 ft 3 in)
44	(Estonia) Timo Tammemaa	Middle Blocker	18 November 1991 (age 34)	2.05 m (6 ft 9 in)
Head coach: (Croatia) Edo Klein

=== Former roster ===
Team roster – season 2023/2024
No.	Player Name	Date of birth	Position
3	(Japan) Takayuki Tashiro	March 24, 1992 (age 34)	Middle blocker
6	(Japan) Jun Yamagishi	August 3, 1999 (age 27)	Setter
7	(Japan) Jin Inoue	April 2, 1992 (age 34)	Middle blocker
9	(Japan) Hiroaki Sasaki (c)	November 19, 1994 (age 31)	Outside hitter
10	(Japan) Takuya Toda	October 25, 1996 (age 30)	Outside hitter
11	(Japan) Kohei Tonozaki	June 28, 1997 (age 29)	Libero
12	(Japan) Kenta Koga	September 17, 1997 (age 29)	Opposite spiker
14	(Taiwan) Chang Yu-sheng	March 30, 2000 (age 26)	Opposite spiker
15	(Japan) Hirohito Kashimura	January 15, 1999 (age 27)	Middle blocker
16	(Japan) Kassho Tanijiri	October 1, 1999 (age 27)	Libero
17	(Japan) Shun Sakai	March 4, 1997 (age 29)	Outside hitter
18	(Japan) Masumi Goto	April 11, 1996 (age 30)	Middle blocker
21	(Japan) Ryoto Honzawa	April 3, 1998 (age 28)	Setter
Head coach: (Croatia) Edo Klein

Team roster – season 2022/2023
No.	Player Name	Date of birth	Position
3	(Japan) Takayuki Tashiro	March 24, 1992 (age 34)	Middle blocker
5	(Japan) Hikaru Sekine	October 31, 1999 (age 27)	Opposite spiker
6	(Japan) Jun Yamagishi	August 3, 1999 (age 27)	Setter
7	(Japan) Jin Inoue	April 2, 1992 (age 34)	Middle blocker
8	(Finland) Peetu Makinen	August 19, 1995 (age 31)	Outside hitter
9	(Japan) Hiroaki Sasaki (c)	November 19, 1994 (age 31)	Outside hitter
10	(Japan) Takuya Toda	October 25, 1996 (age 30)	Outside hitter
11	(Japan) Kohei Tonozaki	June 28, 1997 (age 29)	Libero
14	(Taiwan) Chang Yu-sheng	March 30, 2000 (age 26)	Opposite spiker
15	(Japan) Hirohito Kashimura	January 15, 1999 (age 27)	Middle blocker
16	(Japan) Kassho Tanijiri	October 1, 1999 (age 27)	Libero
17	(Japan) Shun Sakai	March 4, 1997 (age 29)	Outside hitter
18	(Japan) Masumi Goto	April 11, 1996 (age 30)	Middle blocker
21	(Japan) Ryoto Honzawa	April 3, 1998 (age 28)	Setter
Head coach: (Croatia) Edo Klein
