= Märt Tammearu =

Estonian volleyball player (born 2001)

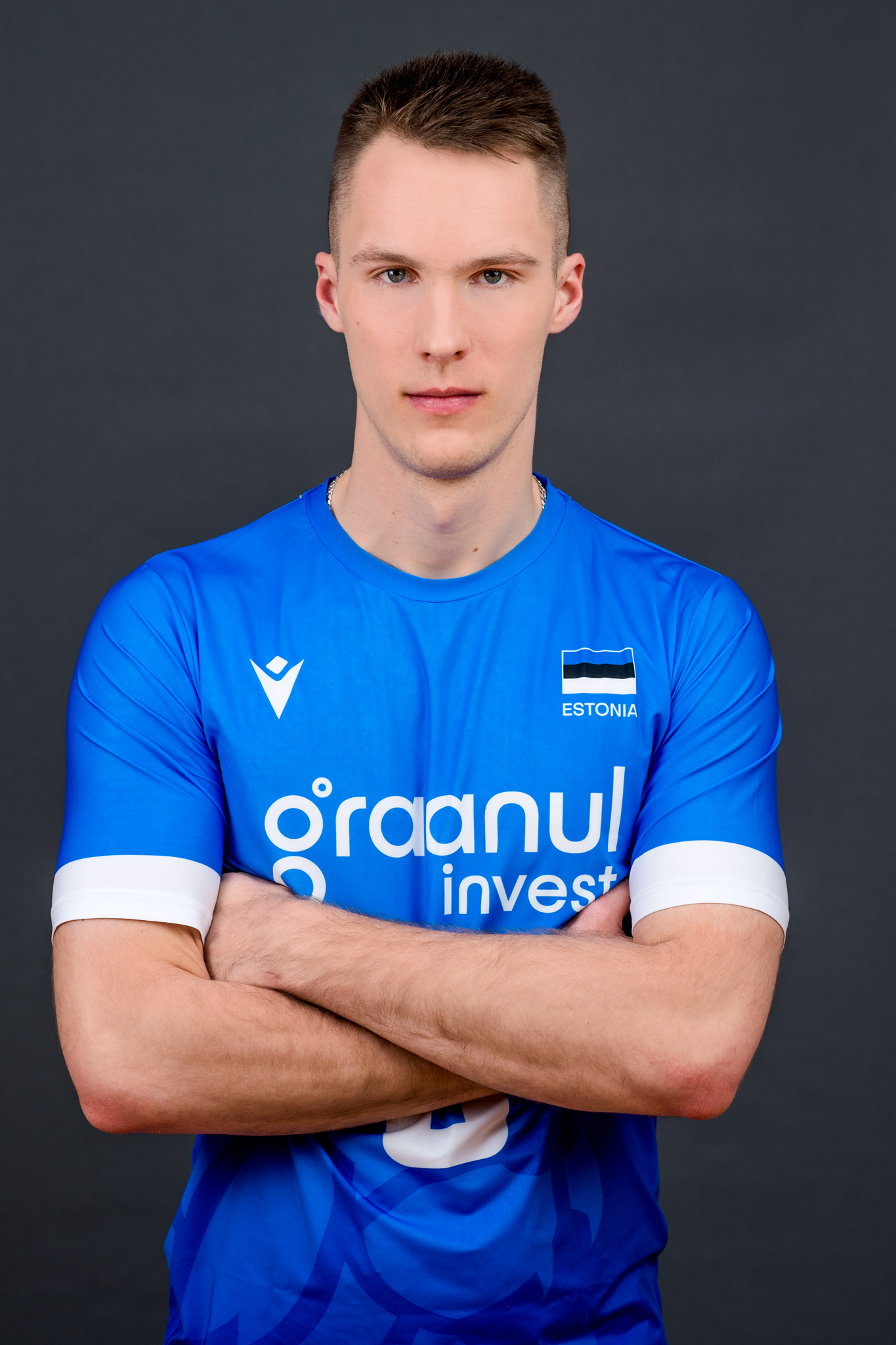

Personal information
- Nationality: Estonian
- Born: 17 March 2001 (age 25)
- Height: 198 cm (6 ft 6 in)

Volleyball information
- Position: Outside hitter
- Current club: (Japan) Voreas Hokkaido
- Number: 10

Career
- Years: Team
- 2016–2018 2018–2021 2021–2023 2023–2024 2024–2025 2025–: (Estonia) Pärnu VK (Estonia) Bigbank Tartu (Belgium) Knack Roeselare (France) Tours VB (Ukraine) VC Barkom-Kazhany (Japan) Voreas Hokkaido

National team
- Years: Team
- 2019–: Estonia
Honours
Men's volleyball
Representing Estonia
European League
Bronze medal – third place	2021 Belgium

Märt Tammearu (born 17 March 2001) is an Estonian volleyball player. He is a member of the Estonian national team and represented his country at the 2021, 2023 and 2026 European Volleyball Championships.

== Sporting achievements ==
=== Clubs ===
CEV Cup

- 2022/2023 - with Knack Roeselare

Baltic League

- 2016/2017 – with Pärnu
- 2017/2018 – with Pärnu
- 2018/2019 – with Bigbank Tartu

National championship

- 2016/2017 Estonian Championship, with Pärnu
- 2017/2018 Estonian Championship, with Pärnu
- 2018/2019 Estonian Championship, with Bigbank Tartu
- 2020/2021 Estonian Championship, with Bigbank Tartu
- 2021/2022 Belgian Championship, with Knack Roeselare
- 2022/2023 Belgian Championship, with Knack Roeselare
- 2023/2024 French Championship, with Tours VB

National cup

- 2016/2017 Estonian Cup, with Pärnu
- 2019/2020 Estonian Cup, with Bigbank Tartu
- 2020/2021 Estonian Cup, with Bigbank Tartu
- 2022/2023 Belgian SuperCup, with Knack Roeselare
- 2022/2023 Belgian Cup, with Knack Roeselare
- 2023/2024 French SuperCup, with Tours VB
- 2025/2026 Emperor's Cup, with Voreas Hokkaido

=== National team ===
- 2021 European League

=== Individual awards ===
- 2018: Baltic League – Best Outside Hitter
- 2019 Young Estonian Volleyball Player of the Year
- 2020 Young Estonian Volleyball Player of the Year
- 2022 Estonian Volleyball Player of the Year
- 2023: Belgian League – Best Outside Hitter
- 2023 Estonian Volleyball Player of the Year
- 2024 Estonian Volleyball Player of the Year
- 2025 Estonian Volleyball Player of the Year
