= Hokkaido Yellow Stars =

Japanese volleyball club

- Full name: Hokkaido Yellow Stars 北海道イエロースターズ
- Short name: HokkaidoYS
- Nickname: Yellow Stars
- Founded: 2016; 10 years ago
- Ground: Sapporo, Hokkaido, Japan
- Owner: Takeda Gead Co., Ltd.
- Head Coach: (Japan) Toru Uesugi
- Captain: (Japan) Kota Yamada
- League: SV.League
- Website: Club home page

Uniforms
Home	Away

Hokkaido Yellow Stars (Japanese: 北海道イエロースターズ) is men's volleyball based in Sapporo, Hokkaido, Japan. The team competed in the SV.League. The owner of the team is Takeda Gead.

== History ==
The team was establish as "Sapphire Hokkaido" in 2016 and joined V.League Division 3 in 2019.

The team was promoted to V2 in 2020. The team rebranded as "Hokkaido Yellow Stars" in June 2023.

The team was granted an SV license in March 2025. However, the league participated team cannot be odd numbers. Since Yellow Stars was the only V.League team that granted the license, they had to remained in the V.League for the 2025–26 season.

The team was promoted to SV.League in April 2026. On October 25, 2026, the team recorded its highest attendance ever at a match against Osaka Bluteon with 3,356 spectators (6,516 spectators in total including the match on October 24).

== Honors ==
V.League Division 2
Champion (1): 2023-24

== League Result ==
League		Position	Teams	Matches	Win	Lose
V.League Division 3	2019-20	3rd	4	15	7	8
V.League Division 2	2020-21	9th	11	18	4	14
V.League Division 2	2021-22	5th	15	28	15	13
V.League Division 2	2022-23	3rd	10	27	19	8
V.League Division 2	2023-24	Champion	10	27	23	4
V.League	2024-25	3rd	8 (East District)	28	26	2
V.League	2025-26	2nd	9 (East District)	28	25	3
SV.League	2026-27					

== Current Roster ==
As of November 2026

Team roster – season 2025/2026
No.	Player Name	Position	Date of birth	Height
1	(Japan) Shun Shinyama	Libero	28 June 1997 (age 29)	1.68 m (5 ft 6 in)
2	(Japan) Kaoru Nakaya	Middle Blocker	14 August 2001 (age 25)	1.97 m (6 ft 6 in)
4	(Japan) Kosuke Sumitomo	Middle Blocker	31 October 2003 (age 23)	1.95 m (6 ft 5 in)
5	(Japan) Shunsuke Watanabe	Libero	11 April 1988 (age 38)	1.80 m (5 ft 11 in)
6	(Norway) Rune Fasteland	Middle Blocker	17 December 1995 (age 30)	2.04 m (6 ft 8 in)
7	(Japan) Kohei Kuboshita	Setter	21 July 1998 (age 28)	1.78 m (5 ft 10 in)
8	(Japan) Taisei Deguchi	Middle Blocker	13 August 2000 (age 26)	1.93 m (6 ft 4 in)
9	(Japan) Sota Yoshimura	Libero	19 February 2003 (age 23)	1.76 m (5 ft 9 in)
10	(Japan) Kota Yamada	Outside Hitter	25 November 1997 (age 28)	1.75 m (5 ft 9 in)
11	(Japan) Sota Ikeda	Opposite	8 October 1998 (age 28)	1.90 m (6 ft 3 in)
12	(Japan) Hyuga Shigetome	Outside Hitter	25 October 1999 (age 27)	1.91 m (6 ft 3 in)
14	(Japan) Ryu Nakano	Outside Hitter	28 August 1998 (age 28)	1.80 m (5 ft 11 in)
16	(Japan) Shotaro Sawaguchi	Outside Hitter	6 January 2002 (age 24)	1.85 m (6 ft 1 in)
17	(Japan) Ryoto Honzawa	Setter	3 April 1998 (age 28)	1.81 m (5 ft 11 in)
18	(Japan) Shinnosuke Hayasaka	Setter	22 April 2000 (age 26)	1.77 m (5 ft 10 in)
19	(Chinese Taipei) Yu-Sheng Chang	Opposite	30 March 2000 (age 26)	1.90 m (6 ft 3 in)
20	(Japan) Jin Tsuzuki	Opposite	28 December 1998 (age 27)	1.95 m (6 ft 5 in)
22	(Japan) Yukihisa Maeda	Libero	13 September 2000 (age 26)	1.66 m (5 ft 5 in)
23	(Japan) Ken Yanagisawa	Middle Blocker	19 September 2002 (age 24)	1.87 m (6 ft 2 in)
38	(Japan) Taishi Horiuchi	Outside Hitter	21 June 2003 (age 23)	1.86 m (6 ft 1 in)
73	(Japan) Namiki Shima	Middle Blocker	2 January 1999 (age 27)	1.88 m (6 ft 2 in)
92	(Norway) Jonas Kvalen	Outside Hitter	6 June 1992 (age 34)	1.95 m (6 ft 5 in)
Head coach: (Japan) Toru Uesugi
