= SV.League =

Japanese professional volleyball league

- Current season, competition or edition: 2026–27 SV.League Men's; 2026–27 SV.League Women's
- SV.League logo
- Sport: Volleyball
- Founded: 2024; 2 years ago
- First season: 2024–25
- No. of teams: Men: 12; Women: 14
- Country: Japan
- Broadcasters: J Sports (Japan only); VBTV (worldwide, except Japan)
- Related competitions: V.League
- Website: Homepage

SV.League, a.k.a. the Daido Life SV.League (大同生命 SV.LEAGUE) for sponsorship reasons, is the top-level professional volleyball league for both men and women in Japan since 2024.

The league succeeded the V.League as the premier volleyball tournament in Japan.

== History ==
The SV.League takes its root from the V.League of the Japan Volleyball League Organization. The league, which was for a long time known as the V.Premier League, was established in 1994.

The Japan Volleyball League Organization would create a new top-flight volleyball league in Japan, over the existing V.League as the highest level of Japanese volleyball league. This plan was announced in January 2023. The name of the league was announced to be the SV.League.

== Name ==
The "S" in the SV.League stands for "Strong, Spread and Society".

== Teams ==
S-V League as the highest level league and the necessary requirements to be licensed include:

1. The main arena can accommodate more than 5,000 people, and more than 80% of the home games are held there.
2. Annual revenue of more than 600 million yen.
3. Having youth teams under the age of 18 and under the age of 15.
4. A dedicated clubhouse.

=== Men ===
SV.League men's teams
No.	Team	Affiliation	Home
1	Voreas Hokkaido	Voreas Inc.	Asahikawa, Hokkaido
2	Hokkaido Yellow Stars	Takeda Gead Co., Ltd.	Sapporo, Hokkaido
3	Tokyo Great Bears	Nature Lab Co., Ltd.	Tokyo
4	Shinshu Matsumoto Tridents	Tridents Co., Ltd.	Nagano
5	Toray Arrows Shizuoka	Toray Industries	Mishima City, Shizuoka
6	JTEKT Stings Aichi	JTEKT Corporation	Kariya, Aichi
7	Wolfdogs Nagoya	Toyoda Gosei Co., Ltd.	Nagoya
8	Osaka Bluteon	Panasonic Corporation	Osaka
9	Suntory Sunbirds Osaka	Suntory Holdings Ltd.	Osaka
10	Nippon Steel Sakai Blazers	Nippon Steel Corporation	Sakai City, Osaka
11	Hiroshima Thunders	Japan Tobacco	Hiroshima City
12	Fragolad Kagoshima	FieldX Co., Ltd.	Hioki, Kagoshima

=== Women ===
SV.League women's teams
No.	Team	Affiliation	Home
1	Aranmare Akita Shonai	Prestige International Inc.	Katagami City, Akita
2	Denso Airybees	Denso	Kōriyama City, Fukushima / Nishio City, Aichi
3	Astemo Rivale Ibaraki	Hitachi	Hitachinaka City, Ibaraki
4	Gunma Green Wings	The Gunma Bank, Ltd.	Maebashi, Gunma
5	Saitama Ageo Medics	Ageo Medical Group	Ageo City, Saitama
6	NEC Red Rockets Kawasaki	NEC	Kawasaki City, Kanagawa
7	Kurobe AquaFairies Toyama	Kurobe City Athletic Association	Kurobe City, Toyama
8	PFU BlueCats Ishikawa Kahoku	PFU Limited	Kahoku City, Ishikawa
9	Aleeza Aichi	Toyota Auto Body	Kariya City, Aichi
10	Toray Arrows Shiga	Toray Industries	Ōtsu, Shiga
11	Osaka Marvelous	Japan Tobacco	Osaka
12	Victorina Himeji	Himeji Victorina Co., LTD	Himeji, Hyogo
13	Okayama Seagulls	OKAYAMA SEAGULLS Co., Ltd.	Okayama City
14	Saga Hisamitsu Springs	Hisamitsu Pharmaceutical	Tosu, Saga

== League winners ==
=== Men ===
Season	Champion	Runner-up	Third place
2024–25	Suntory Sunbirds Osaka	JTEKT Stings Aichi	Osaka Bluteon
2025–26	Osaka Bluteon	Suntory Sunbirds Osaka	JTEKT Stings Aichi

=== Women ===
Season	Champion	Runner-up	Third place
2024–25	Osaka Marvelous	NEC Red Rockets Kawasaki	Saga Hisamitsu Springs
2025–26	Saga Hisamitsu Springs	Osaka Marvelous	NEC Red Rockets Kawasaki

== Relation with the V.League ==
For teams that do not wish to join the S-V League, both men's and women's leagues will be unified into one division under the name of V.League. The East–West Conference system will be introduced.
