= Osaka Bluteon =

Japanese volleyball club

- Founded: 1951
- Ground: Panasonic Arena (Capacity: 2,500)
- Head Coach: (Finland) Tuomas Sammelvuo
- Captain: (Japan) Yuji Nishida
- League: SV.League
- 2025-26: 1st place
- Website: Club home page

Osaka Bluteon (大阪ブルテオン, Ōsaka Buruteon) is a men's volleyball team based in Hirakata City, Osaka, Japan. It plays in SV.League. The club was founded in 1951. It is owned by the Panasonic Corporation.

== History ==
Osaka Bluteon was established as a volleyball club for Matsushita Electric Industrial (now Panasonic) in 1951 and from 1992 to 2024 was known as the Panasonic Panthers.

The club participated in the inaugural 2024–25 season of the SV.League. It adopted its current name and branding in June 2024 ahead of their participation in the new league.

== Names ==
- Panasonic Panthers (1992–2024)
- Osaka Bluteon (2024–)

== Team ==
=== Current roster ===
updated : 16 October 2026

Team roster – season 2025/26
No.	Player name	Date of birth	Position
3	(Japan) Shunsuke Nakamura	March 7, 1999 (age 27)	Setter
5	(Japan) Shoma Tomita	June 20, 1997 (age 29)	Outside hitter
6	(France) Antoine Brizard	May 22, 1994 (age 32)	Setter
8	(Japan) Kenyu Nakamoto	November 21, 1997 (age 28)	Outside hitter
10	(Japan) Akihiro Yamauchi	November 30, 1993 (age 32)	Middle blocker
11	(Japan) Yuji Nishida (c)	January 30, 2000 (age 26)	Opposite
13	(Japan) Tomohiro Yamamoto	November 5, 1994 (age 31)	Libero
15	(Japan) Masato Kai	September 25, 2003 (age 23)	Outside hitter
16	(Japan) Ryohei Iga	June 29, 1994 (age 32)	Libero
18	(Japan) Hiroto Nishiyama	March 4, 2003 (age 23)	Outside hitter
19	(Japan) Keitaro Nishikawa	April 14, 2000 (age 26)	Middle blocker
22	(Philippines) Bryan Bagunas	October 10, 1997 (age 29)	Outside hitter
23	(Japan) Larry Evbade-Dan	August 18, 2000 (age 26)	Middle blocker
33	(Canada) Fynn McCarthy	December 4, 1999 (age 26)	Middle blocker
81	(Cuba) Miguel Ángel López	March 25, 1997 (age 29)	Outside hitter
Head coach: (Finland) Tuomas Sammelvuo

=== Former roster ===
Team roster – season 2023/2024
No.	Player name	Date of birth	Position
1	(Japan) Kunihiro Shimizu	August 11, 1986 (age 40)	Opposite
2	(Japan) Hideomi Fukatsu	June 1, 1990 (age 36)	Setter
3	(Japan) Shunsuke Nakamura	March 7, 1999 (age 27)	Setter
6	(United States) Thomas Jaeschke	September 4, 1993 (age 33)	Outside Hitter
7	(Japan) Yuga Tarumi	November 2, 2000 (age 25)	Outside Hitter
8	(Japan) Kenyu Nakamoto	November 21, 1997 (age 28)	Outside Hitter
10	(Japan) Akihiro Yamauchi (c)	November 30, 1993 (age 32)	Middle Blocker
11	(Japan) Yuji Nishida	January 30, 2000 (age 26)	Opposite
12	(Japan) Tomotake Ito	November 11, 1999 (age 26)	Libero
13	(Japan) Tomohiro Yamamoto	November 5, 1994 (age 31)	Libero
15	(Japan) Tatsunori Otsuka	November 5, 2000 (age 25)	Outside Hitter
17	(Japan) Takeshi Nagano	July 11, 1985 (age 41)	Libero
18	(Japan) Hiroto Nishiyama	March 4, 2003 (age 23)	Outside Hitter
19	(Japan) Keitaro Nishikawa	April 14, 2000 (age 26)	Middle Blocker
20	(Japan) Takahiro Shin	August 10, 1991 (age 35)	Setter
21	(Japan) Yasunari Kodama	July 24, 1994 (age 32)	Middle Blocker
22	(Japan) Yuichiro Komiya	November 16, 1992 (age 33)	Middle Blocker
23	(Japan) Larry Evbade-Dan	August 18, 2000 (age 26)	Middle Blocker
Head coach: (France) Laurent Tillie

== Honours ==
SV.League/Daido Life SV.League

- Champions (×1): 2025–26
- Third place (×1): 2024–25

Japan Volleyball League/V.League/V.Premier League

- Champions (×6): 1971–72, 2007–08, 2009–10, 2011–12, 2013–14, 2018–19
- Runners-up (×7): 1967–68, 1968–69, 1969–70, 1970–71, 1972–73, 2012–13, 2019–20, 2020–21, 2023–24
- Third place (×1): 2022-23

Kurowashiki All Japan Volleyball Tournament

- Champions (×9): 1964, 1966, 1968, 1969, 1973, 1981, 1998, 2009, 2014
- Runners-up (×1): 2024

Emperor's Cup

- Champions (×3): 2011, 2012, 2023
- Runner-up (×1): 2008

Asian Men's Club Volleyball Championship

- Runner-up (×2): 2019, 2025
- Third place (×1): 2010

FIVB Volleyball Men's Club World Championship

- Runner-up (×1): 2025

== Notable players ==
Japan

- Takahiro Yamamoto (2001–2013)
- Tatsuya Fukuzawa (2008–2014 and 2016–2019)
- Kunihiro Shimizu (2008–present)
- Akihiro Yamauchi (2016–present)
- Yuji Nishida (2023–present)

Brazil

- Nalbert Bitencourt (2002–2004)
- Luiz Felipe Fonteles (2007–2008)
- Dante Amaral (2013–2014 and 2015–2016)
- Thiago Alves (2011–2012 and 2014–2015)

France

- Antoine Brizard (2025–)

Poland

- Michał Kubiak (2016–2023)

Cuba

- Miguel Ángel López (2024–present)

United States

- Thomas Jaeschke (2023–2025)

China

- Peng Shikun (2025–present)

Philippines

- Bryan Bagunas (2025–present)

== League results ==
Champion Runner-up

League		Position	Teams	Matches	Win	Lose
V.League	1st (1994–95)	7th	8	21	10	11
V.League	2nd (1995–96)	6th	8	21	10	11
V.League	3rd (1996–97)	5th	8	21	10	11
V.League	4th (1997–98)	3rd	8	21	14	7
V.League	5th (1998–99)	4th	10	18	17	1
V.League	6th (1999-00)	6th	10	18	9	9
V.League	7th (2000–01)	6th	10	18	9	9
V.League	8th (2001–02)	6th	10	18	9	9
V.League	9th (2002–03)	3rd	8	21	13	8
V.League	10th (2003–04)	3rd	8	21	12	9
V.League	11th (2004–05)	4th	8	28	15	13
V.League	12th (2005–06)	5th	8	28	16	12
V・Premier	2006–07	3rd	8	28	17	11
V・Premier	2007–08	Champion	8	28	19	9
V・Premier	2008–09	3rd	8	28	15	13
V・Premier	2009–10	Champion	8	28	20	4
V・Premier	2010–11	4th	8	24	14	10
V・Premier	2011–12	Champion	8	21	17	4
V・Premier	2012–13	Runner-Up	8	28	20	8
V・Premier	2013–14	Champion	8	28	21	7
V・Premier	2014–15	6th	8	21	13	8
V・Premier	2015–16	Runner-up	8	30	16	14
V・Premier	2016–17	5th	8	26	15	11
V・Premier	2017–18	Champion	8	28	23	5
V.League Division 1
V.League Division 1	2018–19	Champion	10	34	28	6
V.League Division 1	2019–20	Runner-up	10	28	24	4
V.League Division 1	2020–21	Runner-up	10	41	33	8
V.League Division 1	2021–22	3rd	10	36	25	11
V.League Division 1	2022–23	3rd	10	39	25	14
V.League Division 1	2023–24	Runner-up	10	38	33	5
SV.League	2024–25	3rd	10	46	37	9
SV.League	2025–26	Champion	10	44	38	6
