= Kenya Fujinaka =

Japanese volleyball player (born 1993)

Personal information
- Nationality: Japan
- Born: 25 July 1993 (age 33); Shunan, Yamaguchi, Japan
- Height: 190 cm (6 ft 3 in)
- Weight: 80 kg (176 lb)
- Spike: 340 cm (134 in)
- Block: 320 cm (126 in)

Volleyball information
- Position: Outside hitter
- Current club: (Japan) Suntory Sunbirds
- Number: Club #10; National Team #37

Career
Years	Teams
2016 – present	Suntory Sunbirds

National team
2015, 2020	Japan
Honours
Men's volleyball
Representing Japan
Asian Cup
Silver medal – second place	2022 Nakhon Pathom	Team
Summer Universiade
Bronze medal – third place	2017 Taipei	Team

Kenya Fujinaka (藤中 謙也, Fujinaka Kenya; born 25 July 1993) is a Japanese male volleyball player. He is part of the Japan men's national volleyball team. On club level he plays for Suntory Sunbirds. He used to play for Senshu University. He started volleyball at the age of seven under the influence of his parents. He used to attend Ube Commercial High School.

== Personal life ==
Kenya Fujinaka has two younger brothers who are playing volleyball in V.League as well. Younger brother Yuto Fujinaka (藤中 優斗) who plays as outside hitter in JTEKT Stings while the youngest brother Soshi Fujinaka (藤中 颯志) joins VC Nagano Trident as Libero.

He's married and has a son.

== Honours ==
=== Club teams ===
- 2020-21 V. League — Champion, with Suntory Sunbirds
- 2021-22 V. League — Champion, with Suntory Sunbirds
- 2022 Asian Club Championship — Silver medal, with Suntory Sunbirds
- 2023 Asian Club Championship — Gold medal, with Suntory Sunbirds
- 2025 AVC Champions League — Bronze medal, with Suntory Sunbirds

=== Individual awards ===
- 2022–23 V. League — Receive award
- 2023 Kurowashiki tournament – Best SIX
