= Tomohiro Ogawa =

Japanese volleyball player (born 1996)

Personal information
- Full name: Tomohiro Ogawa
- Nicknames: Chibi, Tomo
- Nationality: Japanese
- Born: 4 July 1996 (age 30) Kanagawa, Japan
- Education: Meiji University
- Height: 1.76 m (5 ft 9 in)
- Weight: 66 kg (146 lb)
- Spike: 305 cm (120 in)
- Block: 270 cm (110 in)

Volleyball information
- Position: Libero
- Current club: (Japan) Suntory Sunbirds
- Number: 13 (National); 10 (Club)

Career
- Years: Team
- N/A: (Japan) Kawasaki Tachibana High School
- 2014–2019: (Japan) Meiji University
- 2019–2024: (Japan) Wolf Dogs Nagoya
- 2024–2025: (Japan) JTEKT Stings
- 2025–present: (Japan) Suntory Sunbirds

National team
- Years: Team
- 2020–present: Japan
Medal record
Men's volleyball
Representing Japan
FIVB Nations League
Silver medal – second place	2024 Łódź	Team
Bronze medal – third place	2023 Gdańsk	Team
Asian Championship
Gold medal – first place	2023 Urmia	Team
Silver medal – second place	2021 Chiba/Funabashi	Team
Asian Cup
Bronze medal – third place	2018 Taipei	Team

Tomohiro Ogawa (小川 智大, Ogawa Tomohiro; born 4 July 1996) is a Japanese male volleyball player from Yokohama city in Kanagawa Prefecture. He plays in SV.League for Suntory Sunbirds and Japan men's national volleyball team.

== Career ==
Tomohiro started to play volleyball because of his sister when he was in the third year of elementary school. After that, he attended at Kawasaki Tachibana High School and played for the school volleyball team. In the second year of high school, in "All Japan Junior Star Dream Match" tournament, his performance caught the eye of Yoshiteru Okazaki, who was the director of the Meiji University volleyball club at that time. Then, he entered the Meiji University and played for the university's volleyball club.

In the third year of the college, he won the Best Libero award in the fall league match. In the fourth year, he became the captain and led the team finished at the third place. Moreover, he was also called "The guardian deity of Meiji University" for the achievements.

In 2018, Tomohiro was called for Japan U-23 national team, competing in 2018 Asian Men's Volleyball Cup. At the end, Japanese team finished at third place and he received the Best Libero award.

In 2019, he had the name in Japan universiade national team for 2019 Summer Universiade Tournament which was held in Naples – Italy, the team ended up at fifth place and he received the Best Digger award. In the same year, Tomohiro transferred to Wolf Dogs Nagoya and played in V.League Division 1.

In 2021, he was called for Japan senior national team for the first time and had the name in 2021 FIVB Volleyball Men's Nations League Japanese roster.

In 2025, Ogawa is the main libero of the Japan national team competing in 2025 FIVB Men's Volleyball Nations League. It was announced that he will join Suntory Sunbirds at the club level.

== Awards ==
=== Club ===
- 2022–23 Japanese Championship, with Wolfdogs Nagoya
- 2026–27 Polish SuperCup, with Bogdanka LUK Lublin

=== Individual ===
- 2018 Asian Men's Volleyball Cup — Best Libero
- 2019 Summer Universiade Tournament — Best Digger
- 2020–21 V. League — Best Libero
- 2020–21 V. League — Receive Award
- 2022–23 V. League — Best Libero
