= Shoma Tomita =

Japanese volleyball player (born 1997)

Personal information
- Full name: Shoma Tomita
- Nationality: Japan
- Born: June 20, 1997 (age 29); Mishima, Shizuoka
- Height: 190 cm (6 ft 3 in)
- Weight: 80 kg (176 lb)
- Spike: 342 cm (135 in)
- Block: 320 cm (126 in)
- Education: Chuo University

Volleyball information
- Position: Outside hitter
- Current club: (Japan) Osaka Bluteon
- Number: 5 (Club); 11 (National team)

Career
| Years | Teams |
|---|---|
| 2022–2024 | (Japan) Toray Arrows |
| 2024–present | (Japan) Osaka Bluteon |

National team
| 2022–present | Japan |
Honours
Men's volleyball
Representing Japan
Nations League
| Silver medal – second place | 2024 Łódź | Team |
| Bronze medal – third place | 2023 Gdańsk | Team |
Asian Cup
| Silver medal – second place | 2022 Nakhon Pathom | Team |

Shoma Tomita (富田将馬 or とみた しょうま, Tomita Shoma; born June 20, 1997), is a Japanese volleyball player. He plays for the Osaka Bluteon at club level. He is a member of the Japan men's national volleyball team. In 2025 VNL, he served as the national captain team in first 2 weeks of the preliminary round.

== Career ==
He started playing volleyball in 4th grade and eventually played for Chuo University.

In 2019, he was given a contract to play for the Toray Arrows as an informal player. He debuted in V.League, 2019–20 V.League Division 1 Men.

In 2020, he was elevated to the Japan men's national volleyball team.

He was a Japan team member for the 2022 AVC Cup. Japan won the silver medal, which was Japan's best result in AVC Cup history.

In 2024, Tomita signed with Osaka Bluteon and had a name in the national team roster for two consecutive years. He and the Japanese team won the silver medal in 2024 VNL. However, in 2024 Paris Olympic Games, he was not included in the 12-player roster, but he was still called up for the substitute team to support in rehearsals.

In 2025, Tomita continued his contract with Osaka Bluteon and was called up to the national team for competing 2025 VNL and 2025 World championship. In June, he was assigned as the team captain in first two weeks of the VNL.

== Personal life ==
On October 1, 2021, he announced his marriage to his college girlfriend.

== Individual awards ==
=== Club ===
- 2021–22 Japan V.League Division 1 — Best Digger
- 2025 AVC Champions League — Runner-up, with Osaka Bluteon
