= Olivier Lecat =

French volleyball player (born 1967)

Personal information
- Nationality: French
- Born: 30 April 1967 (age 57); Antony, Hauts-de-Seine, France

Sport
- Sport: Volleyball

Olivier Lecat (born 30 April 1967) is a French volleyball player. He competed in the men's tournament at the 1992 Summer Olympics.
