= Tomohiro Yamamoto =

Japanese politician (born 1975)

- 山本 朋広
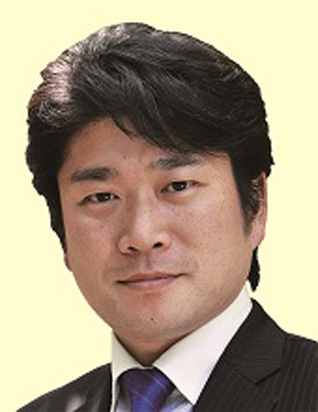

Member of the House of Representatives
- In office 16 December 2012 – 9 October 2024
- Constituency: Southern Kanto PR
- In office 11 September 2005 – 21 July 2009
- Constituency: Kinki PR

Personal details
- Born: 20 June 1975 (age 51) Sakyō, Kyoto, Japan
- Party: Liberal Democratic
- Education: Kansai University; Kyoto University

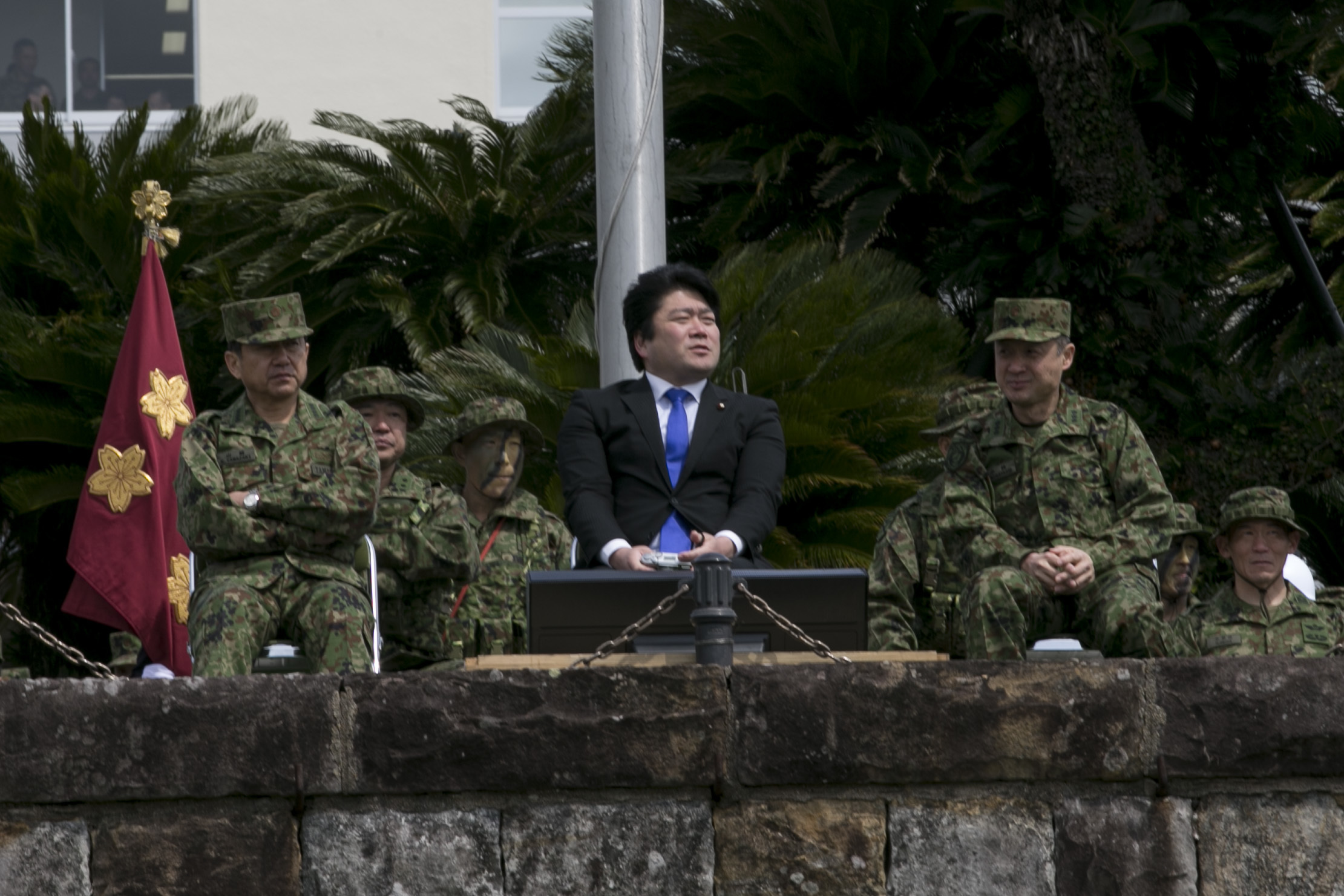
US Marine Corps photo 180407-M-OP674-180 BLT 1／1 Marines work alongside JGSDF during Japanese Amphibious Rapid Deployment Brigade’s unit-activation ceremony

Tomohiro Yamamoto (山本 朋広, Yamamoto Tomohiro; born 20 June 1975) is a Japanese politician of the Liberal Democratic Party and a former member of the House of Representatives in the Diet (national legislature).

== Career ==
A native of Kyoto, Kyoto, Yamamoto attended Kansai University as an undergraduate and received a master's degree from Kyoto University. He was elected to the House of Representatives for the first time in 2005.

His profile on the LDP website:

- Director, Committee on security
- Director, Delibative Council on Political Ethics
- Member, Committee on Fundamental National Politics

On August 4, 2022 it was reported that Yamamoto previously attended a Unification Church event where he had presented Hak Ja Han Moon with carnations, calling her "Mother Moon." This attracted controversy as part of wider media coverage on the Unification Church's connections with the LDP following the assassination of Shinzo Abe.

== Revisionism on Comfort women issues ==
Affiliated to the openly revisionist lobby Nippon Kaigi, Yamamoto was among the LDP members of the Diet who signed 'THE FACTS', an advertising published in 2007 in the Washington Post seeking a full withdrawal of the United States House of Representatives House Resolution 121 on Imperial Japan sexual slavery system ('Comfort women').
