= 2022 Emperor's Cup and Empress' Cup All Japan Volleyball Championship =

Japanese volleyball competition

令和4年度天皇杯・皇后杯 全日本バレーボール選手権大会
- League: Emperor's Cup and Empress' Cup All Japan Volleyball Championship
- Sport: Volleyball
- Duration: 9–18 December 2022
- Teams: Men:26, Women:28 (Final round)
- TV partner(s): NHK BS１(Final match only); NTTSportict

Emperor's Cup
- Season champions: JTEKT Stings
- Season MVP: (Japan) Masahiro Yanagida

Empress' Cup
- Season champions: NEC Red Rockets
- Season MVP: (Japan) Sarina Koga

Seasons
- ← 2021 2023 →

The 2022 Emperor's Cup and Empress' Cup All Japan Volleyball Championship was the 16th edition of Emperor's Cup and Empress' Cup All Japan Volleyball Championship. The final round of the tournament was held from 9–18 December 2022.

JTEKT Stings beat Toray Arrows with straight sets in men's final, winning the title for the second times. NEC Red Rockets won over Toray Arrows with in 4 sets. This was the first time NEC Red Rockets won the title. Masahiro Yanagida and Sarina Koga were chosen to be MVP of this tournament.

== Competition summary ==
=== Events schedule ===
- Prefecture round: April – July 2022
- Regional round: September – October 2022
- Final round: 9–11 & 17–18 December 2022

=== Participant qualification ===
Teams of junior high school students and above which are validly registered in the 2022 Japan Volleyball Association under "Team Membership and Individual Registration Regulations."

=== Match balls ===
- Men: Mikasa V300W
- Women: Molten V5M5000

== Competition format ==
There are three stages in competition: Prefecture round, Regional round and Final round.

Prefecture round:

- A tournament was held to determine one team representing the prefecture that advanced to the regional round for each prefecture.

Regional round:

- A tournament was held for each district block to determined the teams participating in the final round.

Final round

- Knock-out stage
- V1 teams from 2022–2023 V.League directly advanced to the final round.

== Venues ==
1st week of final round (9–11 December)	2nd week of final round (17–18 December)
Tokyo, Japan
Musashino Forest Sport Plaza	Tokyo Metropolitan Gymnasium
Capacity: 7,500	Capacity: 10,000

== Final round ==
=== Emperor's Cup ===
Round of 32
9 December
University of East Asia	2
Voreas Hokkaido	0
9 December
Oita Miyoshi Weisse Adler	2
Higashiyama HS	0
9 December
Ritsumeikan University	0
Tokyo Greatbears	2
9 December
Aisin Tealmare	0
Waseda University	2
9 December
University of Tsukuba	2
Matsumoto HS	0
9 December
Higashi Fukuoka HS	0
Tokai University	2
9 December
Chuo University	2
Nara Dreamers	0
9 December
JTEKT Stings	2
Sendai University	0
9 December
Sakaide Technical HS	0
VC Nagano Tridents	2
9 December
Veertien Mie	0
Fukuoka University	2

Round of 16
10 December
Suntory Sunbirds	3
University of East Asia	0
10 December
Oita Miyoshi Weisse Adler	0
Tokyo Greatbears	3
10 December
Osaka Blazers Sakai	3
Waseda University	0
10 December
University of Tsukuba	0
Toray Arrows	3
10 December
Panasonic Panthers	3
Tokai University	2
10 December
Chuo University	0
JT Thunders Hiroshima	3
10 December
JTEKT Stings	3
VC Nagano Tridents	1
10 December
Fukuoka University	0
Wolfdogs Nagoya	3

Quarterfinals
11 December
Suntory Sunbirds	2
Tokyo Greatbears	3
11 December
Osaka Blazers Sakai	1
Toray Arrows	3
11 December
Panasonic Panthers	1
JT Thunders Hiroshima	3
11 December
JTEKT Stings	3
Wolfdogs Nagoya	1

Semifinals
17 December
Tokyo Greatbears	0
Toray Arrows	3
17 December
JT Thunders Hiroshima	2
JTEKT Stings	3

Final
18 December
Toray Arrows	0
JTEKT Stings	3

==== Round of 32 ====
===== Group A =====
Date	Time		Score		Set 1	Set 2	Set 3	Total
9 Dec	10:00	University of East Asia	2–0	Voreas Hokkaido	29–27	26–24		56–51
9 Dec	11:30	Oita Miyoshi Weisse Adler	2–0	Higashiyama HS	25–15	25–14		50–29
9 Dec	13:00	Ritsumeikan University	0–2	Tokyo Greatbears	18–25	21–25		39–50
9 Dec	14:30	Aisin Tealmare	0–2	Waseda University	22–25	19–25		41–50
9 Dec	16:00	University of Tsukuba	2–0	Matsumoto HS	25–18	25–20		50–38

===== Group B =====
Date	Time		Score		Set 1	Set 2	Set 3	Total
9 Dec	10:00	Higashi Fukuoka HS	0–2	Tokai University	13–25	23–25		36–50
9 Dec	11:30	JTEKT Stings	2–0	Sendai University	25–21	25–19		50–40
9 Dec	13:00	Sakaide Technical HS	0–2	VC Nagano Tridents	16–25	16–25		32–50
9 Dec	14:30	Veertien Mie	0–2	Fukuoka University	0–25	0–25		0–50
9 Dec	16:00	Chuo University	2–0	Nara Dreamers	25–16	25–22		50–38

a.Veertien Mie withdrew from the competition as the spread of COVID-19 among the team one day before the opening.

==== Round of 16 ====
Date	Time		Score		Set 1	Set 2	Set 3	Set 4	Set 5	Total
Dec 10	10:00	Suntory Sunbirds	3–0	University of East Asia	25–10	25–18	26–24			76–52
Dec 10	11:30	Oita Miyoshi Weisse Adler	0–3	Tokyo Greatbears	20–25	16–25	18–25			54–75
Dec 10	13:30	Osaka Blazers Sakai	3–0	Waseda University	25–23	25–21	28–26			78–70
Dec 10	14:30	University of Tsukuba	0–3	Toray Arrows	23–25	24–26	17–25			66–77
Dec 10	10:00	Panasonic Panthers	3–2	Tokai University	22–25	25–20	23–25	25–20	15–13	110–103
Dec 10	11:30	Chuo University	0–3	JT Thunders Hiroshima	20–25	18–25	22–25			60–75
Dec 10	13:30	JTEKT Stings	3–1	VC Nagano Tridents	25–18	25–21	23–25	25–18		97–82
Dec 10	14:30	Fukuoka University	0–3	Wolfdogs Nagoya	23–25	24–26	17–25			64–76

==== Quarterfinals ====
Date	Time		Score		Set 1	Set 2	Set 3	Set 4	Set 5	Total
Dec 11	10:00	Suntory Sunbirds	2–3	Tokyo Greatbears	28–26	21–25	19–25	25–22	13–15	106–113
Dec 11	12:00	Panasonic Panthers	1–3	JT Thunders Hiroshima	21–25	25–21	21–25	19–25		86–96
Dec 11	14:00	Osaka Blazers Sakai	1–3	Toray Arrows	21–25	17–25	25–20	17–25		80–95
Dec 11	16:00	JTEKT Stings	3–1	Wolfdogs Nagoya	25–18	22–25	25–18	25–22		97–83

==== Semifinals ====
Date	Time		Score		Set 1	Set 2	Set 3	Set 4	Set 5	Total	Report
17 Dec	15:00	Tokyo Greatbears	0–3	Toray Arrows	23–25	20–25	19–25			62–75	Report
17 Dec	17:00	JT Thunders Hiroshima	2–3	JTEKT Stings	25–20	31–29	25–27	18–25	12–15	111–116	Report

==== Final ====
Date	Time		Score		Set 1	Set 2	Set 3	Set 4	Set 5	Total	Report
18 Dec	16:00	Toray Arrows	0–3	JTEKT Stings	21–25	13–25	17–25			51–75	Report

=== Empress' Cup ===
Round of 32
9 December
Kochi Tech	0
JA Gifu Rioreina	2
9 December
Okayama Seagulls	2
Kobe Shinwa	0
9 December
Prestige International Aranmare	1
PFU BlueCats	2
9 December
Ageo Medics	2
Breath Hamamatsu	1
9 December
Fukuoka University	0
Kurobe AquaFairies	2
9 December
Tokai University	2
KANOA Laulea's Fukuoka	0
9 December
TWCPE	2
Fukuoka Girasol	0
9 December
Victorina Himeji	2
NUWH	0
9 December
Ohno Hiroshima Oilers	0
Denso Airybees	2
9 December
Hitachi Rivale	2
Brilliant Aries	0
9 December
Ryukoku University	1
Toyota Auto Body Queenseis	2
9 December
University of Tsukuba	2
Artemis Hokkaido	0

Round of 16
10 December
Hisamitsu Springs	3
JA Gifu Rioreina	0
10 December
Okayama Seagulls	0
PFU BlueCats	3
10 December
Ageo Medics	3
Kurobe AquaFairies	0
10 December
Tokai University	0
NEC Red Rockets	3
10 December
Toray Arrows	3
TWCPE	1
10 December
Victorina Himeji	0
Denso Airybees	3
10 December
Hitachi Rivale	3
Toyota Auto Body Queenseis	1
University of Tsukuba	2
JT Marvelous	3

Quarterfinals
11 December
Hisamitsu Springs	3
PFU BlueCats	0
11 December
Ageo Medics	1
NEC Red Rockets	3
11 December
Toray Arrows	3
Denso Airybees	0
11 December
Hitachi Rivale	0
JT Marvelous	3

Semifinals
17 December
Hisamitsu Springs	1
NEC Red Rockets	3
17 December
Toray Arrows	3
JT Marvelous	1

Final
18 December
NEC Red Rockets	3
Toray Arrows	1

==== Round of 32 ====
===== Group A =====
Date	Time		Score		Set 1	Set 2	Set 3	Total
9 Dec	10:00	Kochi Tech	0–2	JA Gifu Rioreina	17–25	12–25		28–50
9 Dec	11:30	Okayama Seagulls	2–0	Kobe Shinwa	25–21	25–19		50–40
9 Dec	13:00	Prestige International Aranmare	1–2	PFU BlueCats	25–20	26–28	6–15	57–63
9 Dec	14:30	Ageo Medics	2–1	Breath Hamamatsu	18–25	25–18	25–21	68–64

===== Group B =====
Date	Time		Score		Set 1	Set 2	Set 3	Total
9 Dec	10:00	Fukuoka University	0–2	Kurobe AquaFairies	17–25	18–25		35–50
9 Dec	11:30	Tokai University	2–0	KANOA Laulea's Fukuoka	25–19	27–25		52–44
9 Dec	13:00	TWCPE	2–0	Fukuoka Girasol	25–16	25–19		50–35
9 Dec	14:30	Victorina Himeji	2–0	NUWH	25–11	25–22		50–33

===== Group C =====
Date	Time		Score		Set 1	Set 2	Set 3	Total
9 Dec	10:00	Ohno Hiroshima Oilers	0–2	Denso Airybees	16–25	17–25		33–50
9 Dec	11:30	Hitachi Rivale	2–0	Brilliant Aries	25–19	25–11		50–30
9 Dec	13:00	Ryukoku University	1–2	Toyota Auto Body Queenseis	23–25	26–24	18–25	67–74
9 Dec	14:30	University of Tsukuba	2–0	Artemis Hokkaido	25–18	25–21		50–39

==== Round of 16 ====
Date	Time		Score		Set 1	Set 2	Set 3	Set 4	Set 5	Total
10 Dec	10:00	Hisamitsu Springs	3–0	JA Gifu Rioreina	25–12	25–11	25–21			75–44
10 Dec	12:00	Okayama Seagulls	0–3	PFU BlueCats	25–27	20–25	22–25			67–77
10 Dec	14:00	Ageo Medics	3–0	Kurobe AquaFairies	25–18	25–22	25–15			75–55
10 Dec	16:00	Tokai University	0–3	NEC Red Rockets	17–25	14–25	25–27			58–77
10 Dec	10:00	Toray Arrows	3–1	TWCPE	25–23	22–25	25–17	25—21		97–86
10 Dec	12:00	Victorina Himeji	0–3	Denso Airybees	25–27	22–25	23–25			70–77
10 Dec	14:00	Hitachi Rivale	3–1	Toyota Auto Body Queenseis	15–25	25–20	25–11	25–18		90–74
10 Dec	16:00	University of Tsukuba	2–3	JT Marvelous	26–24	22–25	26–24	16–25	10–15	100–113

==== Quarterfinals ====
Date	Time		Score		Set 1	Set 2	Set 3	Set 4	Set 5	Total
11 Dec	10:00	Hisamitsu Springs	3–0	PFU BlueCats	25–17	25–22	25–20			75–59
11 Dec	12:00	Toray Arrows	3–0	Denso Airybees	25–22	25–22	25–16			75–60
11 Dec	14:00	Ageo Medics	1–3	NEC Red Rockets	25–23	18–25	14–25	9–25		66–98
11 Dec	16:00	Hitachi Rivale	1–3	JT Marvelous	17–25	23–25	26–24	21–25		87–99

==== Semifinals ====
Date	Time		Score		Set 1	Set 2	Set 3	Set 4	Set 5	Total
17 Dec	11:00	Hisamitsu Springs	1–3	NEC Red Rockets	20–25	21–25	29–27	18–25		88–102
17 Dec	13:00	Toray Arrows	3–1	JT Marvelous	25–19	25–16	15–25	30–28		95–88

==== Final ====
Date	Time		Score		Set 1	Set 2	Set 3	Set 4	Set 5	Total
18 Dec	11:00	NEC Red Rockets	3–1	Toray Arrows	25–14	23–25	25–18	25–23		98–80

== See also ==
- 2022–23 V.League Division 1 Men's
- 2023 Kurowashiki All Japan Volleyball Tournament Men's
