= 2023 Kurowashiki All Japan Volleyball Tournament Men's =

Japanese volleyball competition

第71回黒鷲旗全日本男女選抜バレーボール大会
- League: Kurowashiki All Japan Volleyball Tournament
- Sport: Volleyball
- Duration: May 1–6
- Number of teams: 16

Seasons
- ← 2022 2024 →

2023 Kurowashiki All Japan Volleyball Tournament Men's is the 71st tournament of Kurowashiki All Japan Volleyball Tournament. It will be held from 1–6 May 2023.

== Qualification ==
A selection committee was held on February 7, 2023, and the quotas for each category and the participating teams from universities and high schools were announced. There were ten teams in V1, one team in V2, four teams in college, and one team in high school.

Tokyo Great Bears from V.1 and the Champion of V.2 Voreas Hokkaido announced that they would not participate in the tournament this year. As a result, the runner-up of V.2 Fujitsu Kawasaki Red Spirits will take part in the tournament.

Below is the qualified teams:

Name	Previous appearances	Category	Qualified as
Wolfdogs Nagoya	36	V.League Division 1	No.1 of Regular round of V.League
Suntory Sunbirds	49	V.League Division 1	No.2 of Regular round of V.League
Panasonic Panthers	69	V.League Division 1	No.3 of Regular round of V.League
Osaka Blazers Sakai	69	V.League Division 1	No.4 of Regular round of V.League
Toray Arrows	70	V.League Division 1	No.5 of Regular round of V.League
JTEKT Stings	21	V.League Division 1	No.6 of Regular round of V.League
JT Thunders Hiroshima	60	V.League Division 1	No.7 of Regular round of V.League
VC Nagano Tridents	5	V.League Division 1	No.9 of Regular round of V.League
Oita Miyoshi Weisse Adler	20	V.League Division 1	No.10 of Regular round of V.League
Fujitsu Kawasaki Red Spirits	26	V.League Division 2	The runner-up of V.League Division 2
University of Tsukuba	20	University	
Tokai University	26	University	
Waseda University	13	University	
Nippon Sport Science University	21	University	
Kindai University	16	University	
Higashiyama High School	Debut	High School	

== Pools composition ==
Pool A	Pool B	Pool C	Pool D
Wolfdogs Nagoya	Suntory Sunbirds	Panasonic Panthers	Osaka Blazers Sakai
VC Nagano Tridents	JT Thunders Hiroshima	JTEKT Stings	Toray Arrows
University of Tsukuba	Oita Miyoshi Weisse Adler	Waseda University	Tokai University
Higashiyama High School	Nippon Sport Science University	Fujitsu Kawasaki Red Spirits	Kindai University

== Venues ==
All Matches
Osaka, Japan
Osaka Municipal Central Gymnasium
Capacity: 10,000
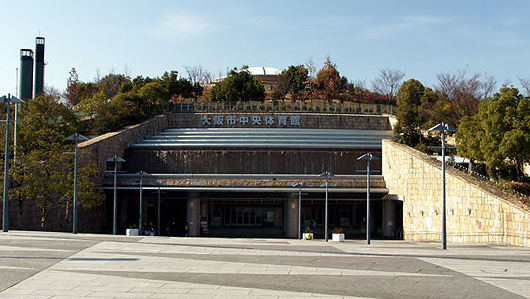

== Preliminary round ==
=== Pool A ===
Pos	Team	Pld	W	L	Pts	SW	SL	SR	SPW	SPL	SPR
1	Wolfdogs Nagoya	3	3	0	0	6	2	3.000	0	0	—
2	University of Tsukuba	3	2	1	0	5	4	1.250	0	0	—
3	VC Nagano Tridents	3	1	2	0	4	4	1.000	0	0	—
4	Higashiyama High School	3	0	3	0	1	6	0.167	0	0	—

Updated to match(es) played on 1 May, 2023. Source: 男子グループ戦星取表
Rules for classification: 1) Number of wins; 2) Set quotient; 3) Points quotient * No winning points gain in this tournament.

Date	Time		Score		Set 1	Set 2	Set 3	Total
1 May	13:00	VC Nagano Tridents	1–2	University of Tsukuba	15–25	25–23	18–25	58–73
1 May	17:00	Wolfdogs Nagoya	2–0	Higashiyama High School	25–14	25–20		50–34
2 May	13:00	VC Nagano Tridents	2–0	Higashiyama High School	–	–	–	
2 May	17:00	Wolfdogs Nagoya	2–1	University of Tsukuba	–	–	–	
3 May	13:00	University of Tsukuba	2–1	Higashiyama High School	–	–	–	
3 May	17:00	Wolfdogs Nagoya	2–1	VC Nagano Tridents	–	–	–	

=== Pool B ===
Pos	Team	Pld	W	L	Pts	SW	SL	SR	SPW	SPL	SPR
1	Suntory Sunbirds	3	3	0	0	6	0	MAX	50	40	1.250
2	JT Thunders Hiroshima	3	2	1	0	4	3	1.333	73	65	1.123
3	Nippon Sport Science University	3	1	2	0	2	5	0.400	40	50	0.800
4	Oita Miyoshi Weisse Adler	3	0	3	0	2	6	0.333	65	73	0.890

Source: 男子グループ戦星取表
Rules for classification: 1) Number of wins; 2) Set quotient; 3) Points quotient * No winning points gain in this tournament.

Date	Time		Score		Set 1	Set 2	Set 3	Total
1 May	13:00	JT Thunders Hiroshima	2–1	Oita Miyoshi Weisse Adler	25–20	23–25	25–20	73–65
1 May	17:00	Suntory Sunbirds	2–0	Nippon Sport Science University	25–17	25–23		50–40
2 May	13:00	JT Thunders Hiroshima	2–0	Nippon Sport Science University	–	–	–	
2 May	17:00	Suntory Sunbirds	2–0	Oita Miyoshi Weisse Adler	–	–	–	
3 May	13:00	Oita Miyoshi Weisse Adler	1–2	Nippon Sport Science University	–	–	–	
3 May	17:00	Suntory Sunbirds	2–0	JT Thunders Hiroshima	–	–	–	

=== Pool C ===
Pos	Team	Pld	W	L	Pts	SW	SL	SR	SPW	SPL	SPR
1	Panasonic Panthers	3	3	0	0	6	1	6.000	50	40	1.250
2	JTEKT Stings	3	2	1	0	5	2	2.500	50	34	1.471
3	Waseda University	3	1	2	0	2	4	0.500	34	50	0.680
4	NSSitsu Kawasaki Red Spirits	3	0	3	0	0	6	0.000	40	50	0.800

Updated to match(es) played on May 1, 2023. Source: 男子グループ戦星取表
Rules for classification: 1) Number of wins; 2) Set quotient; 3) Points quotient * No winning points gain in this tournament.

Date	Time		Score		Set 1	Set 2	Set 3	Total
1 May	11:00	JTEKT Stings	2–0	Waseda University	25–16	25–18		50–34
1 May	15:00	Panasonic Panthers	2–0	NSSitsu Kawasaki Red Spirits	25–20	25–20		50–40
2 May	11:00	JTEKT Stings	2–0	NSSitsu Kawasaki Red Spirits	–	–	–	
2 May	15:00	Panasonic Panthers	2–0	Waseda University	25–14	25–20	–	
3 May	11:00	Waseda University	2–0	NSSitsu Kawasaki Red Spirits	–	–	–	
3 May	15:00	Panasonic Panthers	2–1	JTEKT Stings	–	–	–	

=== Pool D ===
Pos	Team	Pld	W	L	Pts	SW	SL	SR	SPW	SPL	SPR
1	Toray Arrows	3	3	0	0	6	1	6.000	50	39	1.282
2	Osaka Blazers Sakai	3	1	2	0	3	4	0.750	71	76	0.934
3	Kindai University	3	1	2	0	3	5	0.600	76	71	1.070
4	Tokai University	3	1	2	0	2	4	0.500	39	50	0.780

Updated to match(es) played on May 1, 2023. Source: 男子グループ戦星取表
Rules for classification: 1) Number of wins; 2) Set quotient; 3) Points quotient * No winning points gain in this tournament.

Date	Time		Score		Set 1	Set 2	Set 3	Total
1 May	11:00	Toray Arrows	2–0	Tokai University	25–16	25–23		50–39
1 May	15:00	Osaka Blazers Sakai	1–2	Kindai University	25–21	28–30	18–25	71–76
2 May	11:00	Toray Arrows	2–1	Kindai University	–	–	–	
2 May	15:00	Osaka Blazers Sakai	2–0	Tokai University	–	–	–	
3 May	11:00	Tokai University	2–0	Kindai University	–	–	–	
3 May	15:00	Osaka Blazers Sakai	0–2	Toray Arrows	–	–	–	

=== Quarterfinals ===
Date	Time		Score		Set 1	Set 2	Set 3	Set 4	Set 5	Total	Report
4 May	11:00	JT Thunders	0–3	Wolfdogs Nagoya	–	–	–			0–0	
4 May	14:00	Panasonic Panthers	0–3	Osaka Blazers Sakai	–	–	–			0–0	
4 May	11:00	University of Tsukuba	0–3	Suntory Sunbirds	–	–	–			0–0	
4 May	14:00	Toray Arrows	1–3	JTEKT Stings	–	–	–			0–0	

=== Semifinals ===
Date	Time		Score		Set 1	Set 2	Set 3	Set 4	Set 5	Total	Report
5 May	11:00	Wolfdogs Nagoya	3–1	JTEKT Stings	–	–	–			0–0	
5 May	14:00	Suntory Sunbirds	3–1	Panasonic Panthers	–	–	–			0–0	

=== Finals ===
Date	Time		Score		Set 1	Set 2	Set 3	Set 4	Set 5	Total	Report
6 May	11:00	Wolfdogs Nagoya	3–0	Suntory Sunbirds	25–16	28–26	33–31			86–73	Report

== Awards ==
Most Valuable Player

- (Poland) Bartosz Kurek

Fighting Spirit Award

- (Russia) Dmitry Muserskiy

Best Newcomer Award

- (Japan) Ryu Yamamoto

Best Libero

- (Japan) Soshi Fujinaka

Best Six

- (Japan) Shuzo Yamada
- (Poland) Bartosz Kurek
- (Japan) Issei Maeda
- (Cuba) Alain De Armas
- (Japan) Kenya Fujinaka
- (Russia) Dmitry Muserskiy

== See also ==
- 2022–23 V.League Division 1 Men's
- 2022 Emperor's Cup and Empress' Cup
