= 東亞大學 =

東亞大學 or 東亜大学 may refer to:

- Dong-A University
- Đông Á University
- University of East Asia
- University of Macau, former name is University of East Asia
