= 2022–23 V.League Division 1 Men's =

Japanese volleyball league

- League: V.League Division 1
- Sport: Volleyball
- Duration: 22 October 2022 – 23 April 2023
- Games: 187
- Teams: 10
- Total attendance: 263,221
- TV partner(s): V.TV by Easy sports Gaora Sports; Fuji TV

Regular round
- Top seed: Wolfdogs Nagoya
- Top scorer: (Hungary) Krisztián Pádár (859 pts.)
- Promoted to V.1: Voreas Hokkaido
- Relegated to V.2: Oita Miyoshi Weisse Adler

Final stage
- Champions: Wolfdogs Nagoya
- Runners-up: Suntory Sunbirds
- Finals MVP: (Poland) Bartosz Kurek

Men's V.League Division 1 seasons
- ← 2021–22 2023–24 →

The 2022–23 V.League Division 1 Men's is the 29th tournament of the V.League which began from 22 October 2022 to 23 April 2023.

Wolfdogs Nagoya beat defending champion Suntory Sunbirds with straight sets in final match to regain the title of V.League after seven years. Bartosz Kurek was named the MVP of the season. Oita Miyoshi Weisse Adler demoted to V.League Division 2 after losing in the V.Challenge match.

== Club ==
=== Personnel ===
2022–23 V.League Division 1 Men's
Club	Head coach	Captain	Province/City	Colors	Main Sponsor
Suntory Sunbirds	(Japan) Kota Yamamura	(Japan) Masaki Oya	Minoh, Osaka		Suntory
Wolfdogs Nagoya	(Italy) Valerio Baldovin	(Poland) Bartosz Kurek	Inazawa, Aichi		Toyoda Gosei
Panasonic Panthers	(France) Laurent Tillie	(Japan) Akihiro Yamauchi	Hirakata, Osaka		Panasonic
Toray Arrows	(Japan) Ayumu Shinoda	(Japan) Yudai Minemura	Mishima, Shizuoka		Toray Industries
Osaka Blazers Sakai	(Japan) Shinya Chiba	(Japan) Dekita Takashi	Sakai, Osaka		Nippon Steel & Sumitomo Metal
JT Thunders Hiroshima	(Argentina) Raúl Lozano	(Japan) Taishi Onodera	Hiroshima, Hiroshima		Japan Tobacco
JTEKT Stings	(Italy) Federico Fagiani	(Japan) Ryuta Homma	Kariya, Aichi		JTEKT
Tokyo Greatbears	(Japan) Koichiro Shimbo	(Japan) Koga Taichiro	Sumida, Tokyo		NatureLab Tokyo
Oita Miyoshi Weisse Adler	(Zimbabwe) Murray Pole	(Japan) Masato Kubota	Oita, Oita		The Oita Bank Ltd.
VC Nagano Tridents	(Japan) Shinji Kawamura	(Japan) Kohta Ikeda	Takamori, Nagano		Germo Corporation Ltd.

=== Transfer players ===
The list of transfer players in the 2022–23 season
Player	Moving from	Moving to	Ref.
Japanese players
(Japan) Hidetomo Hoshino	(Indonesia) Jakarta BNI 46	(Japan) Tokyo Great Bears	
(Japan) Hirohito Kashimura	(Japan) Suntory Sunbirds	(Japan) Voreas Hokkaido	
(Japan) Kazuma Sonae	(Japan) Oita Miyoshi Weisse Adler	(Japan) VC Nagano Tridents	
(Japan) Kento Miyaura	(Japan) JTEKT Stings	(Poland) PSG Stal Nysa	
(Japan) Masahiro Sekita	(Poland) Cuprum Lubin	(Japan) JTEKT Stings	
(Japan) Masahiro Yanagida	(Japan) Suntory Sunbirds	(Japan) JTEKT Stings	
(Japan) Nakano Ryu	(Japan) Saitama Azalea	(Japan) VC Nagano Tridents	
(Japan) Shohei Nose	(Finland) Savo Volley	(Japan) Tokyo Great Bears	
(Japan) Soshi Fujinaka	(Japan) VC Nagano Tridents	(Japan) Suntory Sunbirds	
(Japan) Ryo Shimokawa	(Japan) Hyogo Delfino	(Japan) VC Nagano Tridents	
(Japan) Takahiro Tozaki	(Japan) Toray Arrows	(Japan) Tokyo Great Bears	
(Japan) Yamagishi Jun	(Japan) VC Nagano Tridents	(Japan) Voreas Hokkaido	
(Japan) Yuji Nishida	(Italy) Volley Callipo	(Japan) JTEKT Stings	
Foreign players
(United States) Aaron Russell	(Italy) Gas Sales Bluenergy Piacenza	(Japan) JT Thunders Hiroshima	
(Philippines) Bryan Bagunas	(Japan) Oita Miyoshi Weisse Adler	(Taiwan) Win Streak	
(Cuba) Carlos Alberto Araujo	(Libya) Alahly Benghazi Sports Club	(Japan) VC Nagano Tridents	
(Taiwan) Chen Chien-Chen	(Japan) JT Thunders Hiroshima	(Japan) Safilva Hokkaido	
(Indonesia) Doni Haryono	(Indonesia) Bogor LavAni	(Japan) VC Nagano Tridents	
(Kenya) Enock Some	(Egypt) Smouha Sporting Club	(Japan) Oita Miyoshi Weisse Adler	
(China) Geng Xin	(China) Tianjin Food Group	(Japan) Panasonic Panthers	
(China) Jiang Chuan	(China) Beijing BAIC Motor	(Japan) JT Thunders Hiroshima	
(Thailand) Kantapat Koonmee	(Thailand) Diamond Food-Fine Chef Sport Club	(Japan) Oita Miyoshi Weisse Adler	
(Philippines) Marck Espejo	(Japan) FC Tokyo	(Philippines) Cignal HD Spikers	
(Brazil) Rafael Araújo	(France) Narbonne Volley	(Japan) Tokyo Great Bears	
(Indonesia) Rivan Nurmulki	(Japan) VC Nagano Tridents	(Indonesia) Bhayangkara Volleyball Club	
(Australia) Thomas Edgar	(Japan) JT Thunders Hiroshima	(Turkey) Galatasaray HDI Istanbul	
(Slovenia) Tine Urnaut	(Russia) VC Zenit Saint Petersburg	(Japan) JTEKT Stings	
(China) Wang Dongchen	(China) Beijing BAIC Motor	(Japan) Wolfdogs Nagoya	
(China) Zhang Binglong	(China) Beijing BAIC Motor	(Japan) Tokyo Great Bears	

=== Foreign players ===
The total number of foreign players is restricted to one per club. Player from Asian Volleyball Confederation (AVC) nations are exempt from these restrictions.

The list of 2022–23 V.League Division 1 Men's Foreign Players
Club	Player	From AVC
Suntory Sunbirds	(Russia) Dmitry Muserskiy (CEV)	(China) Peng Shikun
Wolfdogs Nagoya	(Poland) Bartosz Kurek (CEV)	(China) Wang Dongchen
Panasonic Panthers	(Poland) Michał Kubiak (CEV)	(China) Geng Xin
Toray Arrows	(Hungary) Krisztián Pádár (CEV)	none
Osaka Blazers Sakai	(Canada) Sharone Vernon-Evans (NORCECA)	none
JT Thunders Hiroshima	(United States) Aaron Russell (NORCECA)	(China) Jiang Chuan
JTEKT Stings	(Slovenia) Tine Urnaut (CEV)	(China) Chen Longhai
Tokyo Greatbears	(Brazil) Rafael Araújo (CSV)	(China) Zhang Binglong
Oita Miyoshi Weisse Adler	(Kenya) Enock Some (CAVB)	(Thailand) Kantapat Koonmee
VC Nagano Tridents	(Cuba) Carlos Alberto Araujo (NORCECA)	(Indonesia) Doni Haryono

=== Informal players ===
An informal player is a player still in high school or university but given a contract. Informal players are formally registered in V.League Organization and able to play on court.

The list of 2022–23 V.League Division 1 Men's Informal players
Players	From High schools/Universities	To Club	Ref.
Shunichiro Sato	Tokai University	JTEKT Stings	
Daigo Iwamoto	Waseda University	JTEKT Stings	
Ryu Yamamoto	Tokai University	Suntory Sunbirds	
Ren Oniki	Nippon Sport Science University	Suntory Sunbirds	
Tobias Takeshi	Waseda University	Toray Arrows	
Tatsunori Otsuka	Waseda University	Panasonic Panthers	
Larry Ebadedan-Dan	University of Tsukuba	Panasonic Panthers	
Yuga Tarumi	University of Tsukuba	Panasonic Panthers	
Keitaro Nishikawa	University of Tsukuba	Panasonic Panthers	
Yuki Imahashi	Aoyama Gakuin University	Tokyo Great Bears	
Takumi Kameyama	Juntendo University	Tokyo Great Bears	
Hiroki Koto	Chukyo University	VC Nagano Tridents	
Taiga Itoyama	Fukuoka University	VC Nagano Tridents	
Kosuke Yasui	Meiji University	Osaka Blazers Sakai	
Naoto Akima	Waseda University	Osaka Blazers Sakai	
Shigeru Muto	Nippon Sport Science University	Oita Miyoshi Weisse Adler	
Amane Kumagai	Fukuoka University	Oita Miyoshi Weisse Adler	
Kou Yamashita	University of East Asia	Oita Miyoshi Weisse Adler	
Yuji Kudo (Note: For season 2022–23 only)	Meiji University	VC Nagano Tridents	
Shuto Kawaguchi	Nippon Sport Science University	JT Thunders Hiroshima	
Taisei Deguchi	International Budo University	Oita Miyoshi Weisse Adler	

== Competition format ==
=== Regular round ===
1. 10 teams participate in round robin system, playing each other team 4 times.
2. Teams are ranked in the Regular Round by:
  - Wins ->Points ->Set Percentage ->Scoring Rate
3. The top four teams from the Regular Round will advance to the Final Stage
4. Ranking of 5th to 10th place will be the ranking of the Regular Round and will be the final ranking. The 9th and 10th placed teams will compete in the V.Challenge Match.

=== Final stage ===
1. Top 4 teams of Regular Round to compete each other in one robin round to determine rankings.
2. To begin with the Final stage, the winner of regular season will be given 3 points, the 2nd team will be given 2 points, the third one will be given 1 point as advantage.
3. Teams are ranked in the Final Stage by:
  - Wins ->Points ->Set Percentage ->Scoring Rate ->Ranking of Regular Round
4. The 3rd and 4th team of Final Stage will be the final ranking for 3rd and 4th place.
5. The top 2 teams of Final stage to play against each other in a one match Final.

== Season standing procedure ==
1. The teams will be ranked by the total number of victories
2. The teams will be ranked by the most point gained per match as follows:
  - Match won 3–0 or 3–1: 3 points for the winner, 0 points for the loser
  - Match won 3–2: 2 points for the winner, 1 point for the loser
  - Match forfeited: 3 points for the winner, 0 points (0–25, 0–25, 0–25) for the loser
3. If teams are still tied after examining the number of victories and points gained, then the FIVB will examine the results in order to break the tie in the following order:
  - Set quotient: if two or more teams are tied on total number of victories, they will be ranked by the quotient resulting from the division of the number of all set won by the number of all sets lost.
  - Points quotient: if the tie persists based on the set quotient, the teams will be ranked by the quotient resulting from the division of all points scored by the total of points lost during all sets.
  - If the tie persists based on the point quotient, the tie will be broken based on the team that won the match of the Round Robin Phase between the tied teams. When the tie in point quotient is between three or more teams, these teams ranked taking into consideration only the matches involving the teams in question.

== Regular round ==
=== Regular round standing ===
Pos	Team	Pld	W	L	Pts	SW	SL	SR	SPW	SPL	SPR	Qualification or relegation
1	Wolfdogs Nagoya	36	26	10	75	84	44	1.909	3006	2730	1.101	Qualified for the Final Stage
2	Suntory Sunbirds	36	25	11	71	82	54	1.519	3154	2958	1.066	Qualified for the Final Stage
3	Panasonic Panthers	36	24	12	77	91	50	1.820	3263	2934	1.112	Qualified for the Final Stage
4	Osaka Blazers Sakai	36	24	12	71	80	53	1.509	3080	2920	1.055	Qualified for the Final Stage
5	Toray Arrows	36	23	13	62	82	63	1.302	3273	3215	1.018	
6	JTEKT Stings	36	22	14	70	79	51	1.549	3016	2817	1.071	
7	JT Thunders Hiroshima	36	16	20	50	62	68	0.912	2935	2991	0.981	
8	Tokyo Greatbears	36	10	26	31	47	90	0.522	2902	3174	0.914	
9	VC Nagano Tridents	36	5	31	19	38	96	0.396	2818	3218	0.876	Relegated to V.Challenge Match
10	Oita Miyoshi Weisse Adler	36	5	31	14	25	100	0.250	2554	3044	0.839	Relegated to V.Challenge Match

Source: 2022–23 V.LEAGUE DIVISION1 MEN V・レギュラーラウンド

=== Results table ===
Home \ Away	SUN	WDN	PAN	TOR	OBS	JTH	JTE	TGB	OMW	VCN
Suntory Sunbirds		3–2	3–2	3–1	0–3	3–0	3–2	3–2	3–0	3–1
Suntory Sunbirds		2–3	3–2	1–3	3–1	3–0	3–2	3–1	3–0	3–0
Wolfdogs Nagoya	3–0		0–3	3–1	3–0	3–0	3–0	3–1	3–0	3–0
Wolfdogs Nagoya	1–3		1–3	2–3	3–0	3–0	0–3	3–0	3–0	3–0
Panasonic Panthers	3–0	2–3		3–1	3–1	3–2	0–3	3–0	3–1	3–0
Panasonic Panthers	3–0	2–3		2–3	2–3	3–1	3–2	3–0	3–0	2–3
Toray Arrows	1–3	3–0	3–2		3–2	1–3	3–0	3–2	3–1	3–1
Toray Arrows	3–2	3–0	3–1		1–3	3–1	1–3	3–2	3–0	3–1
Osaka Blazers Sakai	3–0	2–3	3–1	3–2		3–1	0–3	3–1	3–1	3–1
Osaka Blazers Sakai	3–0	0–3	0–3	0–3		1–3	3–0	3–0	3–0	3–1
JT Thunders Hiroshima	0–3	1–3	0–3	3–0	2–3		0–3	3–0	3–1	3–0
JT Thunders Hiroshima	1–3	0–3	1–3	3–1	3–1		1–3	3–1	3–0	3–0
JTEKT Stings	1–3	3–0	2–3	0–3	0–3	3–1		3–1	3–0	3–0
JTEKT Stings	1–3	3–0	3–1	3–1	1–3	3–0		0–3	3–0	3–0
Tokyo Greatbears	0–3	0–3	0–3	0–3	0–3	0–3	2–3		3–1	3–2
Tokyo Greatbears	0–3	0–3	0–3	0–3	1–3	3–2	3–2		3–0	3–1
Oita Miyoshi Weisse Adler	3–1	0–3	0–3	2–3	0–3	0–3	0–3	1–3		3–1
Oita Miyoshi Weisse Adler	0–3	0–3	0–3	3–2	1–3	0–3	0–3	3–2		3–1
VC Nagano Tridents	3–1	0–3	1–3	2–3	0–3	2–3	0–3	2–3	3–0	
VC Nagano Tridents	0–3	2–3	1–3	3–0	1–3	0–3	1–3	1–3	3–1	

Source: none
Legend: Blue = home team win; Red = away team win.

=== Match results ===
- All times are Japan Standard Time (UTC+09:00).

==== Matchday 1 ====
22 October 2022; 13:00	JT Thunders Hiroshima	3–0	VC Nagano Tridents	Hiroshima Prefectural Sports Center; Attendance: 1,590
22 October 2022; 13:00	25–19, 25–22, 25–20; Report Statistics			Hiroshima Prefectural Sports Center; Attendance: 1,590

22 October 2022; 13:00	Osaka Blazers Sakai	3–1	Oita Miyoshi Weisse Adler	Nippon Steel Sakai Gymnasium; Attendance: 437
22 October 2022; 13:00	22–25, 25–16, 25–16, 25–23; Report Statistics			Nippon Steel Sakai Gymnasium; Attendance: 437

22 October 2022; 13:05	Wolfdogs Nagoya	3–0	JTEKT Stings	Toyoda Gosei Memorial Gymnasium; Attendance: 2,500
22 October 2022; 13:05	27–25, 25–18, 25–19; Report Statistics			Toyoda Gosei Memorial Gymnasium; Attendance: 2,500

22 October 2022; 14:00	Panasonic Panthers	3–0	Tokyo Greatbears	Panasonic Arena; Attendance: 2,255
22 October 2022; 14:00	25–22, 25–19, 25–17; Report Statistics			Panasonic Arena; Attendance: 2,255

22 October 2022; 15:05	Suntory Sunbirds	3–1	Toray Arrows	Sky Arena; Attendance: 1,147
22 October 2022; 15:05	25–21, 25–27, 25–18, 25–21; Report Statistics			Sky Arena; Attendance: 1,147

23 October 2022; 13:00	Osaka Blazers Sakai	3–0	Oita Miyoshi Weisse Adler	Nippon Steel Sakai Gymnasium; Attendance: 399
23 October 2022; 13:00	25–16, 25–19, 25–22; Report Statistics			Nippon Steel Sakai Gymnasium; Attendance: 399

23 October 2022; 13:05	JT Thunders Hiroshima	3–0	VC Nagano Tridents	Hiroshima Prefectural Sports Center; Attendance: 2,000
23 October 2022; 13:05	26–24, 25–22, 25–25; Report Statistics			Hiroshima Prefectural Sports Center; Attendance: 2,000

23 October 2022; 13:05	Wolfdogs Nagoya	0–3	JTEKT Stings	Toyoda Gosei Memorial Gymnasium; Attendance: 2,603
23 October 2022; 13:05	23–25, 21–25, 22–25; Report Statistics			Toyoda Gosei Memorial Gymnasium; Attendance: 2,603

23 October 2022; 14:00	Panasonic Panthers	3–0	Tokyo Greatbears	Panasonic Arena; Attendance: 2,101
23 October 2022; 14:00	25–18, 25–15, 25–20; Report Statistics			Panasonic Arena; Attendance: 2,101

23 October 2022; 15:05	Suntory Sunbirds	1–3	Toray Arrows	Sky Arena; Attendance: 908
23 October 2022; 15:05	21–25, 25–22, 23–25, 9–25; Report Statistics			Sky Arena; Attendance: 908

==== Matchday 2 ====
29 October 2022; 13:03	JTEKT Stings	0–3	Osaka Blazers Sakai	Wing Arena Kariya; Attendance: 2,562
29 October 2022; 13:03	24–26, 17–25, 22–25; Report Statistics			Wing Arena Kariya; Attendance: 2,562

29 October 2022; 14:00	Oita Miyoshi Weisse Adler	0–3	JT Thunders Hiroshima	Kodama Cycle Shop Ozu Arena; Attendance: 900
29 October 2022; 14:00	23–25, 23–25, 22–25; Report Statistics			Kodama Cycle Shop Ozu Arena; Attendance: 900

29 October 2022; 14:00	VC Nagano Tridents	3–1	Suntory Sunbirds	Kose Sports Park Gymnasium; Attendance: 650
29 October 2022; 14:00	16–25, 26–24, 28–26, 25–16; Report Statistics			Kose Sports Park Gymnasium; Attendance: 650

29 October 2022; 14:00	Toray Arrows	3–2	Panasonic Panthers	Mishima Civic Gymnasium; Attendance: 1,250
29 October 2022; 14:00	19–25, 25–22, 21–25, 25–20, 15–11; Report Statistics			Mishima Civic Gymnasium; Attendance: 1,250

29 October 2022; 14:08	Tokyo Greatbears	0–3	Wolfdogs Nagoya	Tokyo Gymnasium; Attendance: 4,012
29 October 2022; 14:08	14–25, 16–25, 19–25; Report Statistics			Tokyo Gymnasium; Attendance: 4,012

30 October 2022; 13:00	JTEKT Stings	1–3	Osaka Blazers Sakai	Wing Arena Kariya; Attendance: 2,500
30 October 2022; 13:00	25–20, 19–25, 22–25, 21–25; Report Statistics			Wing Arena Kariya; Attendance: 2,500

30 October 2022; 13:00	Oita Miyoshi Weisse Adler	0–3	JT Thunders Hiroshima	Kodama Cycle Shop Ozu Arena; Attendance: 780
30 October 2022; 13:00	21–25, 16–25, 16–25; Report Statistics			Kodama Cycle Shop Ozu Arena; Attendance: 780

30 October 2022; 13:00	VC Nagano Tridents	0–3	Suntory Sunbirds	Kose Sports Park Gymnasium; Attendance: 750
30 October 2022; 13:00	16–25, 19–25, 22–25; Report Statistics			Kose Sports Park Gymnasium; Attendance: 750

30 October 2022; 14:00	Toray Arrows	3–1	Panasonic Panthers	Mishima Civic Gymnasium; Attendance: 1,300
30 October 2022; 14:00	23–25, 25,20, 32–30, 25–21; Report Statistics			Mishima Civic Gymnasium; Attendance: 1,300

30 October 2022; 14:06	Tokyo Greatbears	1–3	Wolfdogs Nagoya	Tokyo Gymnasium; Attendance: 3,708
30 October 2022; 14:06	22–25, 25–21, 16–25, 22–25; Report Statistics			Tokyo Gymnasium; Attendance: 3,708

==== Matchday 3 ====
5 November 2022; 12:00	Toray Arrows	3–0	JTEKT Stings	YMIT Arena; Attendance: 1,533
5 November 2022; 12:00	25–22, 25–22, 25–18; Report Statistics			YMIT Arena; Attendance: 1,533

5 November 2022; 13:00	Osaka Blazers Sakai	3–1	JT Thunders Hiroshima	Ohama Arena; Attendance: 644
5 November 2022; 13:00	25–17, 22–25, 25–23, 25–19; Report Statistics			Ohama Arena; Attendance: 644

5 November 2022; 13:00	Wolfdogs Nagoya	3–0	VC Nagano Tridents	Toyoda Gosei Memorial Gymnasium; Referees: 1,450
5 November 2022; 13:00	25–15, 25–20, 25–19; Report Statistics			Toyoda Gosei Memorial Gymnasium; Referees: 1,450

5 November 2022; 14:00	Panasonic Panthers	3–1	Oita Miyoshi Weisse Adler	Panasonic Arena; Attendance: 1,518
5 November 2022; 14:00	25–16, 25–21, 23–25, 25–17; Report Statistics			Panasonic Arena; Attendance: 1,518

5 November 2022; 15:05	Suntory Sunbirds	3–2	Tokyo Greatbears	Osaka Municipal Central Gymnasium; Attendance: 1,883
5 November 2022; 15:05	21–25, 25–19, 23–25, 25–15, 15–13; Report Statistics			Osaka Municipal Central Gymnasium; Attendance: 1,883

6 November 2022; 12:00	Toray Arrows	1–3	JTEKT Stings	YMIT Arena; Attendance: 1,572
6 November 2022; 12:00	15–25, 25–18, 21–25, 23–25; Report Statistics			YMIT Arena; Attendance: 1,572

6 November 2022; 13:00	Wolfdogs Nagoya	3–0	VC Nagano Tridents	Toyoda Gosei Memorial Gymnasium; Attendance: 1,503
6 November 2022; 13:00	25–14, 25–19, 25–14; Report Statistics			Toyoda Gosei Memorial Gymnasium; Attendance: 1,503

6 November 2022; 13:00	Osaka Blazers Sakai	1–3	JT Thunders Hiroshima	Ohama Arena; Attendance: 606
6 November 2022; 13:00	20–25, 26–24, 23–25, 21–25; Report Statistics			Ohama Arena; Attendance: 606

6 November 2022; 14:00	Panasonic Panthers	3–0	Oita Miyoshi Weisse Adler	Panasonic Arena; Attendance: 1,782
6 November 2022; 14:00	25–21, 25–22, 25–22; Report Statistics			Panasonic Arena; Attendance: 1,782

6 November 2022; 15:05	Suntory Sunbirds	3–1	Tokyo Greatbears	Osaka Municipal Central Gymnasium; Attendance: 1,623
6 November 2022; 15:05	20–25, 25–22, 25–19, 25–17; Report Statistics			Osaka Municipal Central Gymnasium; Attendance: 1,623

==== Matchday 4 ====
11 November 2022; 19:00	Oita Miyoshi Weisse Adler	0–3	Wolfdogs Nagoya	Kodama Cycle Shop Ozu Arena; Attendance: 560
11 November 2022; 19:00	24–26, 14–25, 23–25; Report Statistics			Kodama Cycle Shop Ozu Arena; Attendance: 560

12 November 2022; 14:00	VC Nagano Tridents	0–3	Osaka Blazers Sakai	Okaya Civic Gymnasium; Attendance: 600
12 November 2022; 14:00	27–29, 12–25, 16–25; Report Statistics			Okaya Civic Gymnasium; Attendance: 600

12 November 2022; 14:00	JT Thunders Hiroshima	0–3	Suntory Sunbirds	Tottori Prefectural Gymnasium; Attendance: 950
12 November 2022; 14:00	19–25, 14–25, 19–25; Report Statistics			Tottori Prefectural Gymnasium; Attendance: 950

12 November 2022; 15:00	Oita Miyoshi Weisse Adler	0–3	Wolfdogs Nagoya	Kodama Cycle Shop Ozu Arena; Attendance: 800
12 November 2022; 15:00	20–25, 22–25, 17–25; Report Statistics			Kodama Cycle Shop Ozu Arena; Attendance: 800

12 November 2022; 16:00	JTEKT Stings	2–3	Panasonic Panthers	CNA Arena Akita; Attendance: 2,834
12 November 2022; 16:00	22–25, 20–25, 25–18, 25–20, 13–15; Report Statistics			CNA Arena Akita; Attendance: 2,834

13 November 2022; 13:00	VC Nagano Tridents	1–3	Osaka Blazers Sakai	Okaya Civic Gymnasium; Attendance: 610
13 November 2022; 13:00	25–22, 26–28, 19–25, 23–25; Report Statistics			Okaya Civic Gymnasium; Attendance: 610

13 November 2022; 13:00	JT Thunders Hiroshima	1–3	Suntory Sunbirds	Tottori Prefectural Gymnasium; Attendance: 1,100
13 November 2022; 13:00	18–25, 16–25, 25–21, 18–25; Report Statistics			Tottori Prefectural Gymnasium; Attendance: 1,100

13 November 2022; 15:30	JTEKT Stings	3–1	Panasonic Panthers	CNA Arena Akita; Attendance: 2,380
13 November 2022; 15:30	23–25, 25–18, 25–23, 25–22; Report Statistics			CNA Arena Akita; Attendance: 2,380

13 November 2022; 16:00	Tokyo Greatbears	0–3	Toray Arrows	Arena Tachikawa Tachihi; Attendance: 1,562
13 November 2022; 16:00	18–25, 19–25, 23–25; Report Statistics			Arena Tachikawa Tachihi; Attendance: 1,562

14 November 2022; 19:30	Tokyo Greatbears	0–3	Toray Arrows	Arena Tachikawa Tachihi; Attendance: 1,374
14 November 2022; 19:30	22–25, 21–25, 20–25; Report Statistics			Arena Tachikawa Tachihi; Attendance: 1,374

==== Matchday 5 ====
19 November 2022; 12:05	Suntory Sunbirds	3–2	JTEKT Stings	Ookini Arena Maishima; Attendance: 2,012
19 November 2022; 12:05	17–25, 24–26, 25–22, 25–14, 15–13; Report Statistics			Ookini Arena Maishima; Attendance: 2,012

19 November 2022; 13:00	Wolfdogs Nagoya	3–0	Osaka Blazers Sakai	Toyoda Gosei Memorial Gymnasium; Attendance: 1,500
19 November 2022; 13:00	25–23, 25–16, 25–23; Report Statistics			Toyoda Gosei Memorial Gymnasium; Attendance: 1,500

19 November 2022; 14:00	Toray Arrows	3–1	VC Nagano Tridents	Konohana Arena; Attendance: 600
19 November 2022; 14:00	23–25, 25–21, 25–20, 25–21; Report Statistics			Konohana Arena; Attendance: 600

19 November 2022; 14:00	Panasonic Panthers	3–2	JT Thunders Hiroshima	Panasonic Arena; Attendance: 1,456
19 November 2022; 14:00	25–21, 23–25, 23–25, 25–20, 15–7; Report Statistics			Panasonic Arena; Attendance: 1,456

20 November 2022; 13:00	Wolfdogs Nagoya	3–0	Osaka Blazers Sakai	Toyoda Gosei Memorial Gymnasium; Attendance: 1,500
20 November 2022; 13:00	25–18, 25–23, 25–17; Report Statistics			Toyoda Gosei Memorial Gymnasium; Attendance: 1,500

20 November 2022; 14:00	Toray Arrows	3–1	VC Nagano Tridents	Konohana Arena; Attendance: 600
20 November 2022; 14:00	25–23, 21–25, 25–19, 25–17; Report Statistics			Konohana Arena; Attendance: 600

20 November 2022; 14:00	Panasonic Panthers	3–1	JT Thunders Hiroshima	Panasonic Arena; Attendance: 1,760
20 November 2022; 14:00	25–18, 21–25, 25–23, 25–21; Report Statistics			Panasonic Arena; Attendance: 1,760

20 November 2022; 17:05	Suntory Sunbirds	3–2	JTEKT Stings	Ookini Arena Maishima; Attendance: 2,536
20 November 2022; 17:05	25–20, 25–21, 18–25, 20–25, 15–11; Report Statistics			Ookini Arena Maishima; Attendance: 2,536

==== Matchday 6 ====
26 November 2022; 13:00	Osaka Blazers Sakai	3–0	Suntory Sunbirds	Kitakyushu City General Gymnasium; Attendance: 1,148
26 November 2022; 13:00	25–23, 25–20, 25–17; Report Statistics			Kitakyushu City General Gymnasium; Attendance: 1,148

26 November 2022; 13:05	JTEKT Stings	3–1	Tokyo Greatbears	JTEKT Arena Nara; Attendance: 1,236
26 November 2022; 13:05	25–21, 25–15, 22–25, 25–15; Report Statistics			JTEKT Arena Nara; Attendance: 1,236

26 November 2022; 14:00	Oita Miyoshi Weisse Adler	2–3	Toray Arrows	Showa Denko Martial Arts Sports Center; Attendance: 620
26 November 2022; 14:00	25–21, 22–25, 17–25, 25–23, 8–15; Report Statistics			Showa Denko Martial Arts Sports Center; Attendance: 620

26 November 2022; 14:00	VC Nagano Tridents	1–3	Panasonic Panthers	Matsumoto City Gymnasium; Attendance: 1,190
26 November 2022; 14:00	17–25, 25–23, 18–25, 19–25; Report Statistics			Matsumoto City Gymnasium; Attendance: 1,190

26 November 2022; 14:00	JT Thunders Hiroshima	1–3	Wolfdogs Nagoya	Matsue City General Gymnasium; Attendance: 1,150
26 November 2022; 14:00	16–25, 25–23, 21–25, 25–27; Report Statistics			Matsue City General Gymnasium; Attendance: 1,150

27 November 2022; 13:00	VC Nagano Tridents	1–3	Panasonic Panthers	Matsumoto City Gymnasium; Attendance: 1,360
27 November 2022; 13:00	21–25, 21–25, 27–25, 17–25; Report Statistics			Matsumoto City Gymnasium; Attendance: 1,360

27 November 2022; 13:00	Oita Miyoshi Weisse Adler	3–2	Toray Arrows	Showa Denko Martial Arts Sports Center; Attendance: 740
27 November 2022; 13:00	22–25, 25–22, 21–25, 25–19, 15–8; Report Statistics			Showa Denko Martial Arts Sports Center; Attendance: 740

27 November 2022; 13:00	JT Thunders Hiroshima	0–3	Wolfdogs Nagoya	Matsue City General Gymnasium; Attendance: 1,100
27 November 2022; 13:00	22–25, 21–25, 17–25; Report Statistics			Matsue City General Gymnasium; Attendance: 1,100

27 November 2022; 13:00	Osaka Blazers Sakai	3–0	Suntory Sunbirds	Kitakyushu City General Gymnasium; Attendance: 1,173
27 November 2022; 13:00	25–21, 25–23, 25–22; Report Statistics			Kitakyushu City General Gymnasium; Attendance: 1,173

27 November 2022; 13:05	JTEKT Stings	0–3	Tokyo Greatbears	JTEKT Arena Nara; Attendance: 1,456
27 November 2022; 13:05	21–25, 23–25, 24–26; Report Statistics			JTEKT Arena Nara; Attendance: 1,456

==== Matchday 7 ====
3 December 2022; 13:00	JTEKT Stings	3–0	VC Nagano Tridents	Naruto Otsuka Sports Park Amino Value Hall; Attendance: 1,150
3 December 2022; 13:00	25–21, 25–19, 25–14; Report Statistics			Naruto Otsuka Sports Park Amino Value Hall; Attendance: 1,150

3 December 2022; 14:05	Panasonic Panthers	2–3	Wolfdogs Nagoya	Panasonic Arena; Attendance: 1,624
3 December 2022; 14:05	22–25, 19–25, 25–23, 25–18, 15–17; Report Statistics			Panasonic Arena; Attendance: 1,624

3 December 2022; 15:00	Suntory Sunbirds	3–0	Oita Miyoshi Weisse Adler	Sky Arena; Attendance: 717
3 December 2022; 15:00	25–17, 25–17, 26–24; Report Statistics			Sky Arena; Attendance: 717

3 December 2022; 15:30	Toray Arrows	3–2	Osaka Blazers Sakai	Mishima Civic Gymnasium; Attendance: 850
3 December 2022; 15:30	25–19, 21–25, 25–21, 20–25, 15–11; Report Statistics			Mishima Civic Gymnasium; Attendance: 850

3 December 2022; 16:00	Tokyo Greatbears	0–3	JT Thunders Hiroshima	Arena Tachikawa Tachihi; Attendance: 1,661
3 December 2022; 16:00	22–25, 21–25, 24–26; Report Statistics			Arena Tachikawa Tachihi; Attendance: 1,661

4 December 2022; 13:00	JTEKT Stings	3–0	VC Nagano Tridents	Naruto Otsuka Sports Park Amino Value Hall; Attendance: 1,300
4 December 2022; 13:00	25–21, 25–13, 25–19; Report Statistics			Naruto Otsuka Sports Park Amino Value Hall; Attendance: 1,300

4 December 2022; 14:05	Panasonic Panthers	2–3	Wolfdogs Nagoya	Panasonic Arena; Attendance: 1,724
4 December 2022; 14:05	20–25, 25–19, 21–25, 25–22, 13–15; Report Statistics			Panasonic Arena; Attendance: 1,724

4 December 2022; 15:00	Tokyo Greatbears	3–2	JT Thunders Hiroshima	Arena Tachikawa Tachihi; Attendance: 1,636
4 December 2022; 15:00	25–21, 22–25, 23–25, 25–20, 15–10; Report Statistics			Arena Tachikawa Tachihi; Attendance: 1,636

4 December 2022; 15:00	Suntory Sunbirds	3–0	Oita Miyoshi Weisse Adler	Sky Arena; Attendance: 871
4 December 2022; 15:00	25–23, 28–26, 25–20; Report Statistics			Sky Arena; Attendance: 871

4 December 2022; 15:11	Toray Arrows	1–3	Osaka Blazers Sakai	Mishima Civic Gymnasium; Attendance: 1,100
4 December 2022; 15:11	20–25, 25–23, 23–25, 21–25; Report Statistics			Mishima Civic Gymnasium; Attendance: 1,100

==== Matchday 8 ====
7 January 2023; 13:00	Osaka Blazers Sakai	3–1	Panasonic Panthers	Ohama Arena; Attendance: 895
7 January 2023; 13:00	23–25, 25–21, 25–23, 25–18; Report Statistics			Ohama Arena; Attendance: 895

7 January 2023; 13:00	Wolfdogs Nagoya	3–0	Suntory Sunbirds	Toyoda Gosei Memorial Gymnasium; Attendance: 1,540
7 January 2023; 13:00	25–20, 25–21, 27–25; Report Statistics			Toyoda Gosei Memorial Gymnasium; Attendance: 1,540

7 January 2023; 14:00	VC Nagano Tridents	2–3	Tokyo Greatbears	Swan Dome; Attendance: 630
7 January 2023; 14:00	25–21, 20–25, 25–22, 20–25, 11–15; Report Statistics			Swan Dome; Attendance: 630

7 January 2023; 14:00	Oita Miyoshi Weisse Adler	0–3	JTEKT Stings	Cycle Shop Kodama Ozu Arena; Attendance: 1,550
7 January 2023; 14:00	25–27, 13–25, 17–25; Report Statistics			Cycle Shop Kodama Ozu Arena; Attendance: 1,550

7 January 2023; 14:35	JT Thunders Hiroshima	3–0	Toray Arrows	Hiroshima Prefectural Sports Center; Attendance: 2,640
7 January 2023; 14:35	30–28, 25–20, 25–22; Report Statistics			Hiroshima Prefectural Sports Center; Attendance: 2,640

8 January 2023; 13:00	VC Nagano Tridents	1–3	Tokyo Greatbears	Swan Dome; Attendance: 740
8 January 2023; 13:00	26–24, 18–25, 18–25, 25–27; Report Statistics			Swan Dome; Attendance: 740

8 January 2023; 13:00	Osaka Blazers Sakai	0–3	Panasonic Panthers	Ohama Arena; Attendance: 1,104
8 January 2023; 13:00	29–31, 21–25, 22–25; Report Statistics			Ohama Arena; Attendance: 1,104

8 January 2023; 13:00	Wolfdogs Nagoya	1–3	Suntory Sunbirds	Toyoda Gosei Memorial Gymnasium; Attendance: 1,575
8 January 2023; 13:00	25–23, 22–25, 28–30, 23–25; Report Statistics			Toyoda Gosei Memorial Gymnasium; Attendance: 1,575

8 January 2023; 13:00	Oita Miyoshi Weisse Adler	0–3	JTEKT Stings	Cycle Shop Kodama Ozu Arena; Attendance: 1,620
8 January 2023; 13:00	14–25, 24–26, 21–25; Report Statistics			Cycle Shop Kodama Ozu Arena; Attendance: 1,620

8 January 2023; 16:00	JT Thunders Hiroshima	3–1	Toray Arrows	Hiroshima Prefectural Sports Center; Attendance: 3,450
8 January 2023; 16:00	25–18, 25–19, 20–25, 25–21; Report Statistics			Hiroshima Prefectural Sports Center; Attendance: 3,450

==== Matchday 9 ====
14 January 2023; 13:05	JTEKT Stings	3–1	JT Thunders Hiroshima	JTEKT Arena Nara; Attendance: 1,896
14 January 2023; 13:05	25–20. 26–24, 23–25, 25–22; Report Statistics			JTEKT Arena Nara; Attendance: 1,896

14 January 2023; 14:00	Toray Arrows	3–0	Wolfdogs Nagoya	Shiwa Town General Gymnasium; Attendance: 900
14 January 2023; 14:00	25–19, 25–20, 25–15; Report Statistics			Shiwa Town General Gymnasium; Attendance: 900

14 January 2022; 14:00	Tokyo Greatbears	0–3	Osaka Blazers Sakai	Sumida Ward General Gymnasium; Attendance: 1,317
14 January 2022; 14:00	15–25, 24–26, 20–25; Report Statistics			Sumida Ward General Gymnasium; Attendance: 1,317

14 January 2023; 14:00	Oita Miyoshi Weisse Adler	3–1	VC Nagano Tridents	Cycle Shop Kodama Ozu Arena; Attendance: 885
14 January 2023; 14:00	25–21, 22–25, 25–18, 25–20; Report Statistics			Cycle Shop Kodama Ozu Arena; Attendance: 885

14 January 2023; 15:00	Suntory Sunbirds	3–2	Panasonic Panthers	Ookini Arena Maishima; Attendance: 1,496
14 January 2023; 15:00	22–25, 25–23, 20–25, 25–21, 18–16; Report Statistics			Ookini Arena Maishima; Attendance: 1,496

15 January 2023; 13:00	Oita Miyoshi Weisse Adler	3–1	VC Nagano Tridents	Cycle Shop Kodama Ozu Arena; Attendance: 940
15 January 2023; 13:00	30–28, 27–29, 25–22, 25–19; Report Statistics			Cycle Shop Kodama Ozu Arena; Attendance: 940

15 January 2023; 13:05	JTEKT Stings	3–0	JT Thunders Hiroshima	JTEKT Arena Nara; Attendance: 1,883
15 January 2023; 13:05	25–22, 25–21, 38–36; Report Statistics			JTEKT Arena Nara; Attendance: 1,883

15 January 2023; 14:00	Tokyo Greatbears	1–3	Osaka Blazers Sakai	Sumida Ward General Gymnasium; Attendance: 1,369
15 January 2023; 14:00	23–25, 25–20, 21–25, 16–25; Report Statistics			Sumida Ward General Gymnasium; Attendance: 1,369

15 January 2023; 14:01	Toray Arrows	3–0	Wolfdogs Nagoya	Shiwa Town General Gymnasium; Attendance: 900
15 January 2023; 14:01	25–21, 26–24, 25–23; Report Statistics			Shiwa Town General Gymnasium; Attendance: 900

15 January 2023; 15:00	Suntory Sunbirds	3–2	Panasonic Panthers	Ookini Arena Maishima; Attendance: 1,618
15 January 2023; 15:00	22–25, 25–21, 25–18, 19–25, 15–11; Report Statistics			Ookini Arena Maishima; Attendance: 1,618

==== Matchday 10 ====
21 January 2023; 13:00	Osaka Blazers Sakai	0–3	JTEKT Stings	Wakayama Prefectural Gymnasium; Attendance: 1,055
21 January 2023; 13:00	18–25, 20–25, 23–25; Report Statistics			Wakayama Prefectural Gymnasium; Attendance: 1,055

21 January 2023; 13:00	Wolfdogs Nagoya	3–1	Tokyo Greatbears	Toyoda Gosei Memorial Gymnasium; Attendance: 1,405
21 January 2023; 13:00	27–25, 21–25, 25–17, 25–19; Report Statistics			Toyoda Gosei Memorial Gymnasium; Attendance: 1,405

21 January 2023; 14:00	JT Thunders Hiroshima	3–1	Oita Miyoshi Weisse Adler	IHI Arena; Attendance: 800
21 January 2023; 14:00	21–25, 25–23, 25–18, 25–21; Report Statistics			IHI Arena; Attendance: 800

21 January 2023; 14:05	Panasonic Panthers	3–1	Toray Arrows	Panasonic Arena; Attendance: 2,637
21 January 2023; 14:05	23–25, 25–19, 25–15, 25–21; Report Statistics			Panasonic Arena; Attendance: 2,637

21 January 2023; 15:00	Suntory Sunbirds	3–1	VC Nagano Tridents	Ookini Arena Maishima; Attendance: 1,711
21 January 2023; 15:00	25–15, 22–25, 25–21, 25–18; Report Statistics			Ookini Arena Maishima; Attendance: 1,711

22 January 2023; 13:00	Osaka Blazers Sakai	3–0	JTEKT Stings	Wakayama Prefectural Gymnasium; Attendance: 1,094
22 January 2023; 13:00	25–21, 25–23, 25–20; Report Statistics			Wakayama Prefectural Gymnasium; Attendance: 1,094

22 January 2023; 13:00	JT Thunders Hiroshima	3–0	Oita Miyoshi Weisse Adler	IHI Arena; Attendance: 900
22 January 2023; 13:00	25–22, 25–16, 25–18; Report Statistics			IHI Arena; Attendance: 900

22 January 2023; 13:00	Wolfdogs Nagoya	3–0	Tokyo Greatbears	Toyoda Gosei Memorial Gymnasium; Attendance: 1,461
22 January 2023; 13:00	25–20, 25–18, 25–23; Report Statistics			Toyoda Gosei Memorial Gymnasium; Attendance: 1,461

22 January 2023; 14:05	Panasonic Panthers	2–3	Toray Arrows	Panasonic Arena; Attendance: 2,216
22 January 2023; 14:05	23–25, 25–19, 25–19, 19–25, 13–15; Report Statistics			Panasonic Arena; Attendance: 2,216

22 January 2023; 15:00	Suntory Sunbirds	3–0	VC Nagano Tridents	Ookini Arena Maishima; Attendance: 941
22 January 2023; 15:00	25–22, 25–19, 25–21; Report Statistics			Ookini Arena Maishima; Attendance: 941

==== Matchday 11 ====
28 January 2023; 14:00	JT Thunders Hiroshima	2–3	Osaka Blazers Sakai	Tawarada Memorial Gymnasium; Attendance: 960
28 January 2023; 14:00	21–25, 18–25, 25–22, 25–18, 12–15; Report Statistics			Tawarada Memorial Gymnasium; Attendance: 960

28 January 2023; 14:00	Tokyo Greatbears	0–3	Suntory Sunbirds	Ariake Coliseum; Attendance: 1,458
28 January 2023; 14:00	23–25, 23–25, 26–28; Report Statistics			Ariake Coliseum; Attendance: 1,458

28 January 2023; 14:00	Oita Miyoshi Weisse Adler	0–3	Panasonic Panthers	Takachiho Martial Arts Gymnasium; Attendance: 1,050
28 January 2023; 14:00	19–25, 21–25, 16–25; Report Statistics			Takachiho Martial Arts Gymnasium; Attendance: 1,050

28 January 2023; 14:00	VC Nagano Tridents	0–3	Wolfdogs Nagoya	Matsumoto City Gymnasium; Attendance: 790
28 January 2023; 14:00	21–25, 31–33, 22–25; Report Statistics			Matsumoto City Gymnasium; Attendance: 790

28 January 2023; 16:05	JTEKT Stings	0–3	Toray Arrows	Wing Arena Kariya; Attendance: 2,250
28 January 2023; 16:05	23–25, 18–25, 21–25; Report Statistics			Wing Arena Kariya; Attendance: 2,250

29 January 2023; 13:00	JT Thunders Hiroshima	3–1	Osaka Blazers Sakai	Tawarada Memorial Gymnasium; Attendance: 1,160
29 January 2023; 13:00	25–18, 25–22, 23–25, 25–21; Report Statistics			Tawarada Memorial Gymnasium; Attendance: 1,160

29 January 2023; 13:00	VC Nagano Tridents	2–3	Wolfdogs Nagoya	Matsumoto City Gymnasium; Attendance: 890
29 January 2023; 13:00	23–25, 14–25, 25–22, 26–24, 10–15; Report Statistics			Matsumoto City Gymnasium; Attendance: 890

29 January 2023; 13:00	Oita Miyoshi Weisse Adler	0–3	Panasonic Panthers	Takachiho Martial Arts Gymnasium; Attendance: 1,170
29 January 2023; 13:00	13–25, 15–25, 13–25; Report Statistics			Takachiho Martial Arts Gymnasium; Attendance: 1,170

29 January 2023; 14:00	Tokyo Greatbears	0–3	Suntory Sunbirds	Ariake Coliseum; Attendance: 1,609
29 January 2023; 14:00	21–25, 16–25, 17–25; Report Statistics			Ariake Coliseum; Attendance: 1,609

29 January 2023; 16:00	JTEKT Stings	3–1	Toray Arrows	Wing Arena Kariya; Attendance: 1,827
29 January 2023; 16:00	25–21, 22–25, 25–15, 25–20; Report Statistics			Wing Arena Kariya; Attendance: 1,827

==== Matchday 12 ====
3 February 2023; 19:30	Tokyo Greatbears	0–3	Panasonic Panthers	Sumida Ward General Gymnasium; Attendance: 1,645
3 February 2023; 19:30	22–25, 22–25, 20–25; Report Statistics			Sumida Ward General Gymnasium; Attendance: 1,645

4 February 2023; 13:00	JTEKT Stings	3–0	Wolfdogs Nagoya	Okazaki Central Park General Gymnasium; Attendance: 2,000
4 February 2023; 13:00	25–23, 25–22, 32–30; Report Statistics			Okazaki Central Park General Gymnasium; Attendance: 2,000

4 February 2023; 14:00	VC Nagano Tridents	2–3	JT Thunders Hiroshima	Matsumoto City Gymnasium; Attendance: 870
4 February 2023; 14:00	26–24, 16–25, 17–25, 25–21, 11–15; Report Statistics			Matsumoto City Gymnasium; Attendance: 870

4 February 2023; 14:00	Oita Miyoshi Weisse Adler	0–3	Osaka Blazers Sakai	Showa Denko Martial Arts Sports Center; Attendance: 625
4 February 2023; 14:00	13–25, 21–25, 19–25; Report Statistics			Showa Denko Martial Arts Sports Center; Attendance: 625

4 February 2023; 14:05	Toray Arrows	1–3	Suntory Sunbirds	Mishima Civic Gymnasium; Attendance: 980
4 February 2023; 14:05	25–22, 23–25, 20–25, 33–35; Report Statistics			Mishima Civic Gymnasium; Attendance: 980

4 February 2023; 16:00	Tokyo Greatbears	0–3	Panasonic Panthers	Sumida Ward General Gymnasium; Attendance: 1,830
4 February 2023; 16:00	21–25, 22–25, 18–25; Report Statistics			Sumida Ward General Gymnasium; Attendance: 1,830

5 February 2023; 13:00	VC Nagano Tridents	0–3	JT Thunders Hiroshima	Matsumoto City Gymnasium; Attendance: 880
5 February 2023; 13:00	22–25, 21–25, 22–25; Report Statistics			Matsumoto City Gymnasium; Attendance: 880

5 February 2023; 13:00	JTEKT Stings	3–0	Wolfdogs Nagoya	Okazaki Central Park General Gymnasium; Attendance: 2,100
5 February 2023; 13:00	28–26, 25–22, 25–21; Report Statistics			Okazaki Central Park General Gymnasium; Attendance: 2,100

5 February 2023; 13:00	Oita Miyoshi Weisse Adler	1–3	Osaka Blazers Sakai	Showa Denko Martial Arts Sports Center; Attendance: 682
5 February 2023; 13:00	15–25, 28–26, 16–26, 20–25; Report Statistics			Showa Denko Martial Arts Sports Center; Attendance: 682

5 February 2023; 14:00	Toray Arrows	3–2	Suntory Sunbirds	Mishima Civic Gymnasium; Attendance: 1,001
5 February 2023; 14:00	25–18, 15–25, 18–25, 25–23, 15–13; Report Statistics			Mishima Civic Gymnasium; Attendance: 1,001

==== Matchday 13 ====
11 February 2023; 14:00	Tokyo Greatbears	3–1	Oita Miyoshi Weisse Adler	Ariake Coliseum; Attendance: 1,401
11 February 2023; 14:00	21–25, 25–20, 25–18, 25–12; Report Statistics			Ariake Coliseum; Attendance: 1,401

12 February 2023; 14:00	Tokyo Greatbears	3–0	Oita Miyoshi Weisse Adler	Ariake Coliseum; Attendance: 1,359
12 February 2023; 14:00	32–30, 25–20, 25–16; Report Statistics			Ariake Coliseum; Attendance: 1,359

==== Matchday 14 ====
17 February 2023; 19:00	Suntory Sunbirds	3–0	JT Thunders Hiroshima	Sumiyoshi Sports Center; Attendance: 1,145
17 February 2023; 19:00	25–23, 27–25, 25–14; Report Statistics			Sumiyoshi Sports Center; Attendance: 1,145

18 February 2023; 13:00	Wolfdogs Nagoya	3–0	Oita Miyoshi Weisse Adler	Toyoda Gosei Memorial Gymnasium; Attendance: 1,374
18 February 2023; 13:00	25–22, 25–19, 25–15; Report Statistics			Toyoda Gosei Memorial Gymnasium; Attendance: 1,374

18 February 2023; 13:00	Osaka Blazers Sakai	3–1	VC Nagano Tridents	Nippon Steel Sakai Gymnasium; Attendance: 427
18 February 2023; 13:00	25–15, 27–29, 25–21, 25–20; Report Statistics			Nippon Steel Sakai Gymnasium; Attendance: 427

18 February 2023; 14:00	Toray Arrows	3–2	Tokyo Greatbears	Konohana Arena; Attendance: 1,000
18 February 2023; 14:00	18–25, 20–25, 27–25, 25–13, 15–11; Report Statistics			Konohana Arena; Attendance: 1,000

18 February 2023; 15:00	Suntory Sunbirds	3–0	JT Thunders Hiroshima	Sumiyoshi Sports Center; Attendance: 1,288
18 February 2023; 15:00	28–26, 25–23, 25–20; Report Statistics			Sumiyoshi Sports Center; Attendance: 1,288

18 February 2023; 18:00	Panasonic Panthers	0–3	JTEKT Stings	Panasonic Arena; Attendance: 2,870
18 February 2023; 18:00	22–25, 16–25, 19–25; Report Statistics			Panasonic Arena; Attendance: 2,870

19 February 2023; 13:00	Wolfdogs Nagoya	3–0	Oita Miyoshi Weisse Adler	Toyoda Gosei Memorial Gymnasium; Attendance: 1,525
19 February 2023; 13:00	25–15, 25–12, 25–18; Report Statistics			Toyoda Gosei Memorial Gymnasium; Attendance: 1,525

19 February 2023; 13:00	Osaka Blazers Sakai	3–1	VC Nagano Tridents	Nippon Steel Sakai Gymnasium; Attendance: 468
19 February 2023; 13:00	24–26, 25–19, 25–19, 25–18; Report Statistics			Nippon Steel Sakai Gymnasium; Attendance: 468

19 February 2023; 14:00	Toray Arrows	3–2	Tokyo Greatbears	Konohana Arena; Attendance: 1,100
19 February 2023; 14:00	25–20, 25–17, 21–25, 22–25, 15–13; Report Statistics			Konohana Arena; Attendance: 1,100

19 February 2023; 15:00	Panasonic Panthers	3–2	JTEKT Stings	Panasonic Arena; Attendance: 2,971
19 February 2023; 15:00	25–19, 25–27, 26–24, 18–25, 15–13; Report Statistics			Panasonic Arena; Attendance: 2,971

==== Matchday 15 ====
25 February 2023; 13:00	Osaka Blazers Sakai	2–3	Wolfdogs Nagoya	Ohama Daishin Arena; Attendance: 890
25 February 2023; 13:00	27–25, 25–23, 22–25, 17–25, 12–15; Report Statistics			Ohama Daishin Arena; Attendance: 890

25 February 2023; 13:05	JTEKT Stings	1–3	Suntory Sunbirds	Okazaki Central Park General Gymnasium; Attendance: 2,650
25 February 2023; 13:05	25–19, 17–25, 19–25, 15–25; Report Statistics			Okazaki Central Park General Gymnasium; Attendance: 2,650

25 February 2023; 14:00	VC Nagano Tridents	2–3	Toray Arrows	Matsumoto City Gymnasium; Attendance: 990
25 February 2023; 14:00	25–20, 25–27, 18–25, 25–22, 9–15; Report Statistics			Matsumoto City Gymnasium; Attendance: 990

25 February 2023; 14:00	Oita Miyoshi Weisse Adler	1–3	Tokyo Greatbears	Cycle Shop Kodama Ozu Arena; Attendance: 610
25 February 2023; 14:00	24–26, 25–19, 24–26, 16–25; Report Statistics			Cycle Shop Kodama Ozu Arena; Attendance: 610

25 February 2023; 14:00	JT Thunders Hiroshima	0–3	Panasonic Panthers	Iwakuni General Gymnasium; Attendance: 1,500
25 February 2023; 14:00	21–25, 23–25, 17–25; Report Statistics			Iwakuni General Gymnasium; Attendance: 1,500

26 February 2023; 13:00	VC Nagano Tridents	3–0	Toray Arrows	Matsumoto City Gymnasium; Attendance: 1,130
26 February 2023; 13:00	25–20, 25–20, 25–21; Report Statistics			Matsumoto City Gymnasium; Attendance: 1,130

26 February 2023; 13:00	JT Thunders Hiroshima	1–3	Panasonic Panthers	Iwakuni General Gymnasium; Attendance: 1,550
26 February 2023; 13:00	19–25, 26–24, 14–25, 19–25; Report Statistics			Iwakuni General Gymnasium; Attendance: 1,550

26 February 2023; 13:00	Osaka Blazers Sakai	0–3	Wolfdogs Nagoya	Ohama Daishin Arena; Attendance: 938
26 February 2023; 13:00	18–25, 21–25, 18–25; Report Statistics			Ohama Daishin Arena; Attendance: 938

26 February 2023; 13:00	Oita Miyoshi Weisse Adler	3–2	Tokyo Greatbears	Cycle Shop Kodama Ozu Arena; Attendance: 643
26 February 2023; 13:00	20–25, 21–25, 25–20, 25–23, 16–14; Report Statistics			Cycle Shop Kodama Ozu Arena; Attendance: 643

26 February 2023; 13:05	JTEKT Stings	1–3	Suntory Sunbirds	Okazaki Central Park General Gymnasium; Attendance: 3,069
26 February 2023; 13:05	19–25, 25–21, 21–25, 18–25; Report Statistics			Okazaki Central Park General Gymnasium; Attendance: 3,069

==== Matchday 16 ====
4 March 2023; 14:05	Tokyo Greatbears	2–3	JTEKT Stings	Ariake Coliseum; Attendance: 6,235
4 March 2023; 14:05	26–24, 21–25, 22–25, 25–23, 7–15; Report Statistics			Ariake Coliseum; Attendance: 6,235

4 March 2023; 14:00	Toray Arrows	3–1	Oita Miyoshi Weisse Adler	Konohana Arena; Attendance: 550
4 March 2023; 14:00	27–29, 27–25, 25–18, 25–17; Report Statistics			Konohana Arena; Attendance: 550

4 March 2023; 14:00	Panasonic Panthers	3–0	VC Nagano Tridents	Ota City General Gymnasium; Attendance: 1,511
4 March 2023; 14:00	25–15, 25–23, 25–11; Report Statistics			Ota City General Gymnasium; Attendance: 1,511

4 March 2023; 15:00	Wolfdogs Nagoya	3–0	JT Thunders Hiroshima	Toyoda Gosei Memorial Gymnasium; Attendance: 1,211
4 March 2023; 15:00	25–20, 25–20, 25–20; Report Statistics			Toyoda Gosei Memorial Gymnasium; Attendance: 1,211

4 March 2023; 15:00	Suntory Sunbirds	0–3	Osaka Blazers Sakai	Sky Arena; Attendance: 1,263
4 March 2023; 15:00	22–25, 20–25, 30–32; Report Statistics			Sky Arena; Attendance: 1,263

5 March 2023; 14:00	Wolfdogs Nagoya	3–0	JT Thunders Hiroshima	Toyoda Gosei Memorial Gymnasium; Attendance: 1,533
5 March 2023; 14:00	25–19, 25–22, 25–22; Report Statistics			Toyoda Gosei Memorial Gymnasium; Attendance: 1,533

5 March 2023; 14:00	Toray Arrows	3–0	Oita Miyoshi Weisse Adler	Konohana Arena; Attendance: 700
5 March 2023; 14:00	27–25, 25–22, 25–20; Report Statistics			Konohana Arena; Attendance: 700

5 March 2023; 14:00	Panasonic Panthers	2–3	VC Nagano Tridents	Ota City General Gymnasium; Attendance: 1,389
5 March 2023; 14:00	21–25, 22–25, 25–17, 25–21, 11–15; Report Statistics			Ota City General Gymnasium; Attendance: 1,389

5 March 2023; 14:05	Tokyo Greatbears	3–2	JTEKT Stings	Ariake Coliseum; Attendance: 8,142
5 March 2023; 14:05	23–25, 25–23, 25–23, 23–25, 15–13; Report Statistics			Ariake Coliseum; Attendance: 8,142

5 March 2023; 15:00	Suntory Sunbirds	3–1	Osaka Blazers Sakai	Sky Arena; Attendance: 1,129
5 March 2023; 15:00	25–11, 25–21, 19–25, 35–33; Report Statistics			Sky Arena; Attendance: 1,129

==== Matchday 17 ====
11 March 2023; 13:00	Wolfdogs Nagoya	0–3	Panasonic Panthers	Toyoda Gosei Memorial Gymnasium; Attendance: 1,816
11 March 2023; 13:00	19–25, 16–25, 14–25; Report Statistics			Toyoda Gosei Memorial Gymnasium; Attendance: 1,816

11 March 2023; 13:00	Osaka Blazers Sakai	3–2	Toray Arrows	Sakai City Kanaoka Park Gymnasium; Attendance: 704
11 March 2023; 13:00	23–25, 25–23, 14–25, 25–13, 16–14; Report Statistics			Sakai City Kanaoka Park Gymnasium; Attendance: 704

11 March 2023; 14:00	VC Nagano Tridents	0–3	JTEKT Stings	Matsumoto City Gymnasium; Attendance: 2,300
11 March 2023; 14:00	16–25, 21–25, 14–25; Report Statistics			Matsumoto City Gymnasium; Attendance: 2,300

11 March 2023; 14:00	Oita Miyoshi Weisse Adler	3–1	Suntory Sunbirds	Cycle Shop Kodama Ozu Arena; Attendance: 860
11 March 2023; 14:00	20–25, 25–21, 25–20, 30–28; Report Statistics			Cycle Shop Kodama Ozu Arena; Attendance: 860

11 March 2023; 14:00	JT Thunders Hiroshima	3–0	Tokyo Greatbears	Higashi-Hiroshima Sports Park Gymnasium; Attendance: 1,100
11 March 2023; 14:00	25–19, 25–21, 25–18; Report Statistics			Higashi-Hiroshima Sports Park Gymnasium; Attendance: 1,100

12 March 2023; 13:00	VC Nagano Tridents	1–3	JTEKT Stings	Matsumoto City Gymnasium; Attendance: 2,400
12 March 2023; 13:00	21–25, 25–22, 19–25, 23–25; Report Statistics			Matsumoto City Gymnasium; Attendance: 2,400

12 March 2023; 13:00	Wolfdogs Nagoya	1–3	Panasonic Panthers	Toyoda Gosei Memorial Gymnasium; Attendance: 2,043
12 March 2023; 13:00	25–27, 22–25, 25–23, 17–25; Report Statistics			Toyoda Gosei Memorial Gymnasium; Attendance: 2,043

12 March 2023; 13:00	Osaka Blazers Sakai	0–3	Toray Arrows	Sakai City Kanaoka Park Gymnasium; Attendance: 718
12 March 2023; 13:00	23–25, 19–25, 23–25; Report Statistics			Sakai City Kanaoka Park Gymnasium; Attendance: 718

12 March 2023; 13:00	JT Thunders Hiroshima	3–1	Tokyo Greatbears	Higashi-Hiroshima Sports Park Gymnasium; Attendance: 900
12 March 2023; 13:00	22–25, 25–22, 25–17, 29–27; Report Statistics			Higashi-Hiroshima Sports Park Gymnasium; Attendance: 900

12 March 2023; 13:00	Oita Miyoshi Weisse Adler	0–3	Suntory Sunbirds	Cycle Shop Kodama Ozu Arena; Attendance: 1,046
12 March 2023; 13:00	20–25, 19–25, 19–25; Report Statistics			Cycle Shop Kodama Ozu Arena; Attendance: 1,046

==== Matchday 18 ====
17 March 2023; 19:05	Suntory Sunbirds	3–2	Wolfdogs Nagoya	Sumiyoshi Sports Center; Attendance: 1,523
17 March 2023; 19:05	20–25, 25–16, 23–25, 25–23, 15–13; Report Statistics			Sumiyoshi Sports Center; Attendance: 1,523

18 March 2023; 13:00	JTEKT Stings	3–0	Oita Miyoshi Weisse Adler	Wing Arena Kariya; Attendance: 1,770
18 March 2023; 13:00	25–18, 25–17, 25–18; Report Statistics			Wing Arena Kariya; Attendance: 1,770

18 March 2023; 14:00	Tokyo Greatbears	3–2	VC Nagano Tridents	National Yoyogi Stadium Second Gymnasium; Attendance: 1,687
18 March 2023; 14:00	25–23, 21–25, 16–25, 25–19, 16–14; Report Statistics			National Yoyogi Stadium Second Gymnasium; Attendance: 1,687

18 March 2023; 14:00	Toray Arrows	1–3	JT Thunders Hiroshima	Numazu City General Gymnasium; Attendance: 2,084
18 March 2023; 14:00	19–25, 20–25, 25–21, 36–38; Report Statistics			Numazu City General Gymnasium; Attendance: 2,084

18 March 2023; 14:02	Panasonic Panthers	3–1	Osaka Blazers Sakai	Panasonic Arena; Attendance: 2,105
18 March 2023; 14:02	25–14, 25–18, 22–25, 25–23; Report Statistics			Panasonic Arena; Attendance: 2,105

18 March 2023; 15:05	Suntory Sunbirds	2–3	Wolfdogs Nagoya	Sumiyoshi Sports Center; Attendance: 2,045
18 March 2023; 15:05	19–25, 25–23, 19–25, 25–23, 10–15; Report Statistics			Sumiyoshi Sports Center; Attendance: 2,045

19 March 2023; 13:00	JTEKT Stings	3–0	Oita Miyoshi Weisse Adler	Wing Arena Kariya; Attendance: 2,250
19 March 2023; 13:00	25–21, 25–17, 25–20; Report Statistics			Wing Arena Kariya; Attendance: 2,250

19 March 2023; 14:00	Tokyo Greatbears	3–1	VC Nagano Tridents	National Yoyogi Stadium Second Gymnasium; Attendance: 2,120
19 March 2023; 14:00	16–25, 28–26, 25–23, 25–21; Report Statistics			National Yoyogi Stadium Second Gymnasium; Attendance: 2,120

19 March 2023; 14:00	Toray Arrows	3–1	JT Thunders Hiroshima	Numazu City General Gymnasium; Attendance: 2,098
19 March 2023; 14:00	25–20, 23–25, 25–22,25–21; Report Statistics			Numazu City General Gymnasium; Attendance: 2,098

19 March 2023; 14:00	Panasonic Panthers	2–3	Osaka Blazers Sakai	Panasonic Arena; Attendance: 2,510
19 March 2023; 14:00	22–25, 25–20, 25–27, 25–16, 13–15; Report Statistics			Panasonic Arena; Attendance: 2,510

==== Matchday 19 ====
25 March 2023; 13:00	Wolfdogs Nagoya	3–1	Toray Arrows	Park Arena Komaki; Attendance: 1,571
25 March 2023; 13:00	21–25, 25–22, 25–22, 25–19; Report Statistics			Park Arena Komaki; Attendance: 1,571

25 March 2023; 13:00	Osaka Blazers Sakai	3–1	Tokyo Greatbears	Nippon Steel Sakai Gymnasium; Attendance: 516
25 March 2023; 13:00	23–25, 25–21, 25–16, 26–24; Report Statistics			Nippon Steel Sakai Gymnasium; Attendance: 516

25 March 2023; 14:00	Panasonic Panthers	3–0	Suntory Sunbirds	Panasonic Arena; Attendance: 2,772
25 March 2023; 14:00	25–22, 25–19, 25–19; Report Statistics			Panasonic Arena; Attendance: 2,772

25 March 2023; 14:00	VC Nagano Tridents	3–0	Oita Miyoshi Weisse Adler	Matsumoto City Gymnasium; Attendance: 1,280
25 March 2023; 14:00	25–17, 25–22, 28–26; Report Statistics			Matsumoto City Gymnasium; Attendance: 1,280

25 March 2023; 14:05	JT Thunders Hiroshima	0–3	JTEKT Stings	FPCO Arena Fukuyama; Attendance: 2,600
25 March 2023; 14:05	22–25, 17–25, 19–25; Report Statistics			FPCO Arena Fukuyama; Attendance: 2,600

26 March 2023; 13:00	VC Nagano Tridents	3–1	Oita Miyoshi Weisse Adler	Matsumoto City Gymnasium; Attendance: 1,460
26 March 2023; 13:00	25–21, 20–25, 25–16, 25–20; Report Statistics			Matsumoto City Gymnasium; Attendance: 1,460

26 March 2023; 13:00	Osaka Blazers Sakai	3–0	Tokyo Greatbears	Nippon Steel Sakai Gymnasium; Attendance: 526
26 March 2023; 13:00	25–16, 25–17, 25–17; Report Statistics			Nippon Steel Sakai Gymnasium; Attendance: 526

26 March 2023; 13:00	Wolfdogs Nagoya	2–3	Toray Arrows	Park Arena Komaki; Attendance: 1,889
26 March 2023; 13:00	23–25, 22–25, 25–21, 25–22, 14–16; Report Statistics			Park Arena Komaki; Attendance: 1,889

26 March 2023; 13:05	JT Thunders Hiroshima	1–3	JTEKT Stings	FPCO Arena Fukuyama; Attendance: 2,700
26 March 2023; 13:05	25–21, 19–25, 22–25, 23–25; Report Statistics			FPCO Arena Fukuyama; Attendance: 2,700

26 March 2023; 14:00	Panasonic Panthers	3–0	Suntory Sunbirds	Panasonic Arena; Attendance: 2,479
26 March 2023; 14:00	25–18, 25–23, 25–18; Report Statistics			Panasonic Arena; Attendance: 2,479

== Final stage ==
=== Final four ===
Pos	Team	Pld	W	L	Pts	SW	SL	SR	Qualification
1	Suntory Sunbirds	3	3	0	8	9	6	1.500	Advance for the Final Match
2	Wolfdogs Nagoya	3	2	1	10	8	4	2.000	Advance for the Final Match
3	Panasonic Panthers	3	1	2	5	6	7	0.857	
4	Osaka Blazers Sakai	3	0	3	1	3	9	0.333	

Source: V.League Final Stage

* Bonus points of regular round: 1st place–3 point, 2nd place–2 point, 3rd place–1 point, 4th place–0 point.

==== Matches ====
8 April 2023; 12:00	Wolfdogs Nagoya	3–0	Osaka Blazers Sakai	Shimadzu Arena Kyoto; Attendance: 2,086
8 April 2023; 12:00	25–18, 25–21, 25–20; Report Statistics			Shimadzu Arena Kyoto; Attendance: 2,086

8 April 2023; 15:00	Suntory Sunbirds	3–2	Panasonic Panthers	Shimadzu Arena Kyoto; Attendance: 2,115
8 April 2023; 15:00	31–29, 22–25, 23–25, 25–22, 15–9; Report Statistics			Shimadzu Arena Kyoto; Attendance: 2,115

9 April 2023; 12:00	Wolfdogs Nagoya	2–3	Suntory Sunbirds	Shimadzu Arena Kyoto; Attendance: 2,253
9 April 2023; 12:00	28–26, 21–25, 25–20, 19–25, 18–20; Report Statistics			Shimadzu Arena Kyoto; Attendance: 2,253

9 April 2023; 15:00	Panasonic Panthers	3–1	Osaka Blazers Sakai	Shimadzu Arena Kyoto; Attendance: 2,308
9 April 2023; 15:00	27–25, 28–26, 20–25, 32–30; Report Statistics			Shimadzu Arena Kyoto; Attendance: 2,308

16 April 2023; 12:00	Wolfdogs Nagoya	3–1	Panasonic Panthers	Sky Hall Toyota; Attendance: 2,697
16 April 2023; 12:00	25–19, 25–20, 21–25, 25–16; Report Statistics			Sky Hall Toyota; Attendance: 2,697

16 April 2023; 15:00	Suntory Sunbirds	3–2	Osaka Blazers Sakai	Sky Hall Toyota; Attendance: 2,217
16 April 2023; 15:00	25–20, 21–25, 25–18, 27–29, 15–9; Report Statistics			Sky Hall Toyota; Attendance: 2,217

=== Final ===
Final
Suntory Sunbirds	0
Wolfdogs Nagoya	3

==== Final Match ====
23 April 2023; 14:00	Suntory Sunbirds	0–3	Wolfdogs Nagoya	National Yoyogi Stadium First Gymnasium; Attendance: 7,293
23 April 2023; 14:00	23–25, 18–25, 26–28; Report Statistics			National Yoyogi Stadium First Gymnasium; Attendance: 7,293

== All-Star ==
25 December 2022; 13:30	Team Billy	3–2	Team V-kichi	Toyoda Gosei Memorial Gymnasium
25 December 2022; 13:30	15–11, 6–15, 15–12, 8–15, 15–12			Toyoda Gosei Memorial Gymnasium

- VOM: (Poland) Bartosz Kurek (Team Billy)

== Final standing ==
Rank	Team
1st place, gold medalist(s)	Wolfdogs Nagoya
2nd place, silver medalist(s)	Suntory Sunbirds
3rd place, bronze medalist(s)	Panasonic Panthers
4	Osaka Blazers Sakai
5	Toray Arrows
6	JTEKT Stings
7	JT Thunders Hiroshima
8	Tokyo Greatbears
9	VC Nagano Tridents
10	Oita Miyoshi Weisse Adler

Qualified for the 2024 Asian Club Championship

== Awards ==
=== Individual awards (technical performance) ===
- Best scorer
  - (Hungary) Krisztián Pádár
- Best spiker
  - (Japan) Hiromasa Miwa
- Best blocker
  - (Japan) Kentaro Takahashi
- Best server
  - (United States) Aaron Russell
- Best receiver
  - (Japan) Kazuma Sonae

=== V.League Honour award ===
The award was distributed to players who participate in 10 seasons or more, 230 games or more.

- (Japan) Hidetomo Hoshino (Tokyo Great Bears)
- (Japan) Shin Takahiro (Panasonic Panthers)
- (Japan) Takuya Yasunaga (JT Thunders Hiroshima)
- (Japan) Ryosuke Hakamaya (JTEKT Stings)

=== Outstanding personal records ===
- (vacancy for this season)

=== Final stage ===
- Most valuable player
  - (Poland) Bartosz Kurek
- Fighting spirit award
  - (Russia) Dmitry Muserskiy
- Best Six
  - (Poland) Bartosz Kurek
  - (Russia) Dmitry Muserskiy
  - (Japan) Tatsunori Otsuka
  - (Japan) Ryota Denda
  - (Japan) Akihiro Yamauchi
  - (Japan) Masaki Oya
- Best libero
  - (Japan) Tomohiro Ogawa
- Receive award
  - (Japan) Kenya Fujinaka
- Best newcomer award
  - (vacancy for this season)
- Best coach award
  - (Italy) Valerio Baldovin
- Matsudaira Yasutaka award
  - (Italy) Valerio Baldovin
- Special award
  - (Japan) Naonobu Fujii

== V.Challenge Match ==
=== Qualification ===
Division 1 Teams ranked 9th and 10th and Division 2 teams ranked 1st and 2nd.

- Teams from Division 2 must obtain S1 license.

Teams from V.1	Teams from V.2
VC Nagano Tridents	Voreas Hokkaido
Oita Miyoshi Weisse Adler	Fujitsu Kawasaki Red Spirits

=== Format ===
V1 9th place team vs V2 2nd place team
V1 10th place team vs V2 1st place team

Teams to play 2 match system. The winning teams to promote to/ stay in 2023–24 V.League.

The winning team is determined as follow:

Wins ->Points ->Set Percentage ->Scoring Rate -> V.1 Teams

=== Matches ===
Group 1
VC Nagano Tridents	3	3
Fujitsu Kawasaki Red Spirits	1	1

Group 2
Oita Miyoshi Weisse Adler	2	1
Voreas Hokkaido	3	3

Group 1

8 April 2023; 11:00	VC Nagano Tridents	3–1	Fujitsu Kawasaki Red Spirits	Hitachinaka City Sports Park Total Gymnastics; Attendance: 576
8 April 2023; 11:00	23–25, 33–31, 25–19, 25–18; Report Statistics			Hitachinaka City Sports Park Total Gymnastics; Attendance: 576

9 April 2023; 11:00	VC Nagano Tridents	3–1	Fujitsu Kawasaki Red Spirits	Hitachinaka City Sports Park Total Gymnastics; Attendance: 751
9 April 2023; 11:00	22–25, 25–19, 26–24, 25–13; Report Statistics			Hitachinaka City Sports Park Total Gymnastics; Attendance: 751

Group 2

8 April 2023; 14:00	Oita Miyoshi Weisse Adler	2–3	Voreas Hokkaido	Hitachinaka City Sports Park Total Gymnastics; Attendance: 718
8 April 2023; 14:00	25–17, 16–25, 25–20, 22–25, 10–15; Report Statistics			Hitachinaka City Sports Park Total Gymnastics; Attendance: 718

9 April 2023; 14:00	Oita Miyoshi Weisse Adler	1–3	Voreas Hokkaido	Hitachinaka City Sports Park Total Gymnastics; Attendance: 862
9 April 2023; 14:00	17–25, 25–21, 23–25, 17–25; Report Statistics			Hitachinaka City Sports Park Total Gymnastics; Attendance: 862

=== Results ===
Promoted to/Stayed in Division 1
Deomoted to/Stayed in Division 2

Team
VC Nagano Tridents
Voreas Hokkaido
Fujitsu Kawasaki Red Spirits
Oita Miyoshi Weisse Adler

== See also ==
- 2022 Emperor's Cup and Empress' Cup
- 2023 Kurowashiki All Japan Volleyball Tournament Men's
