= Masaki Oya (volleyball) =

Japanese volleyball player (born 1995)

Personal information
- Full name: Masaki Oya
- Nickname: Ma-kun, Maki
- Nationality: Japanese
- Born: 23 April 1995 (age 31); Nagasaki, Japan
- Height: 1.77 m (5 ft 10 in)
- Weight: 77 kg (170 lb)
- Spike: 315 cm (124 in)
- Block: 300 cm (120 in)
- Education: University of East Asia

Volleyball information
- Position: Setter
- Current club: (Japan) Sakai Blazers
- Number: 9
Medal record
Men's volleyball
Representing Japan
Asian Championship
Silver medal – second place	2021 Chiba/Funabashi	Team
Asian Youth Championship
Bronze medal – third place	2012 Tehran	Team
Asian U23 Championship
Silver medal – second place	2017 Ardabil	Team

Masaki Oya (大宅 真樹, born 23 April 1995) is a Japanese male volleyball player. He plays for Japan men's national volleyball team and the Suntory Sunbirds in V.League 1, where he has served as captain since 2020–21 season. He was formerly the Japan U-23 national team's captain.

== Early life ==
Oya was born in Nagasaki, Japan on 23 April 1995. He started playing volleyball when he entered elementary school, as his other family members also played.

Oya attended Omura Technial High School, a school with a strong tradition of volleyball from 2011-2014, and played on the school’s volleyball club for all three years he was there.

== Club career ==
Oya attended the University of East Asia from 2014–2019, playing for the university club team.

In 2019 he was signed with the Suntory Sunbirds, and he was appointed captain of the team from the 2020-2021 season, and led the team to a league championship that season and the next.

== National teams ==
- Japan men's national under-19 volleyball team (2012–2013)
  - 2012 Asian Youth Boys Volleyball Championship
  - 2013 FIVB Volleyball Boys' U19 World Championship
- Japan men's national under-21 volleyball team (2014)
  - 2014 Asian Men's U20 Volleyball Championship
- Japan men's national under-23 volleyball team (2017)
  - 2017 Asian Men's U23 Volleyball Championship
  - 2017 FIVB Volleyball Men's U23 World Championship
- Japan men's national volleyball team (2018, 2020–present)

== Awards ==
=== Individual awards ===
- 2022: V.League Division 1 - Most valuable player
- 2023: V.League Division 1 – Best SIX
- 2023: Asian Club Championship – Best setter

=== Club teams ===
- 2020-21 V. League — Champion, with Suntory Sunbirds
- 2021-22 V. League — Champion, with Suntory Sunbirds
- 2022 Asian Club Championship — Silver medal, with Suntory Sunbirds
- 2023 Asian Club Championship — Gold medal, with Suntory Sunbirds
- 2025 AVC Champions League — Bronze medal, with Suntory Sunbirds

=== Junior national team ===
- 2012 Asian Youth Boys Volleyball Championship – Bronze Medal
- 2017 Asian Men's U23 Volleyball Championship – Runner-up
