= Luciano Vicentín =

Argentine volleyball player (born 2000)

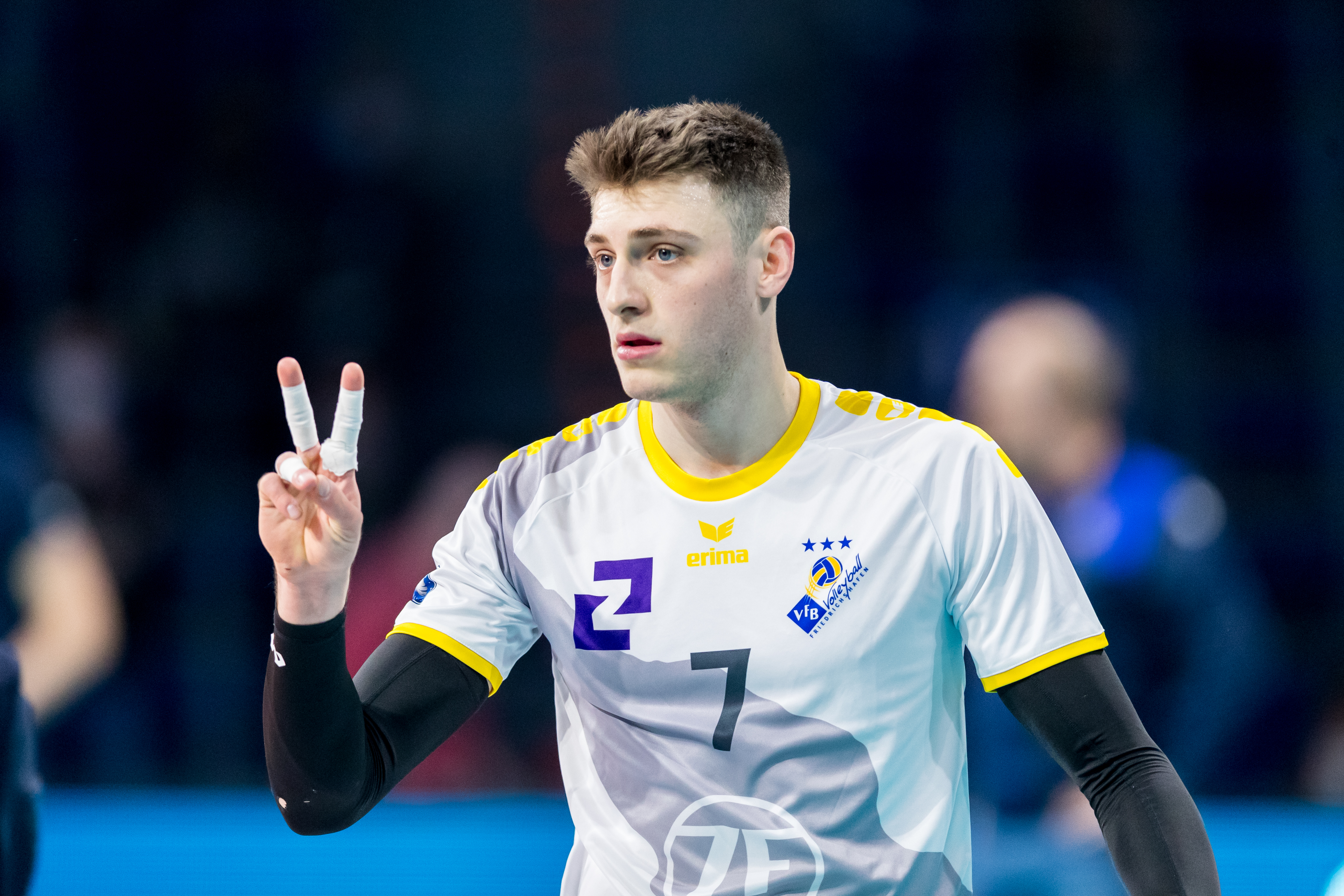
- Vicentín in 2022

Personal information
- Born: 4 April 2000 (age 26) Paraná, Argentina
- Height: 1.97 m (6 ft 6 in)
- Weight: 84 kg (185 lb)

Volleyball information
- Position: Outside hitter
- Current club: Tokyo Great Bears

Career
- Years: Team
- 2018–2020 2020–2021 2021–2023 2023–2024 2024–2025 2025–: River Plate; BBTS Bielsko-Biała; VfB Friedrichshafen; Ziraat Bankası Ankara; Jastrzębski Węgiel; Tokyo Great Bears

National team
- Years: Team
- –: Argentina
Honours
Men's volleyball
Representing Argentina
CSV South American Championship
Gold medal – first place	2023 Recife
Silver medal – second place	2019 Chile

Luciano Vicentín (born 4 April 2000) is an Argentine professional volleyball player who plays as an outside hitter for Tokyo Great Bears and the Argentina national team.

Vicentín was called up to the national team for the 2022 World Championship.

== Honours ==
=== Club ===
- Domestic
  - 2021–22 German Cup, with VfB Friedrichshafen
  - 2021–22 German Championship, with VfB Friedrichshafen
  - 2023–24 Turkish SuperCup, with Ziraat Bankası Ankara
  - 2024–25 Polish Cup, with Jastrzębski Węgiel

=== Individual awards ===
- 2023: CSV South American Championship – Most valuable player
