= Đông Á University =

University in Vietnam

Coordinates: 16.0320°N 108.2213°E

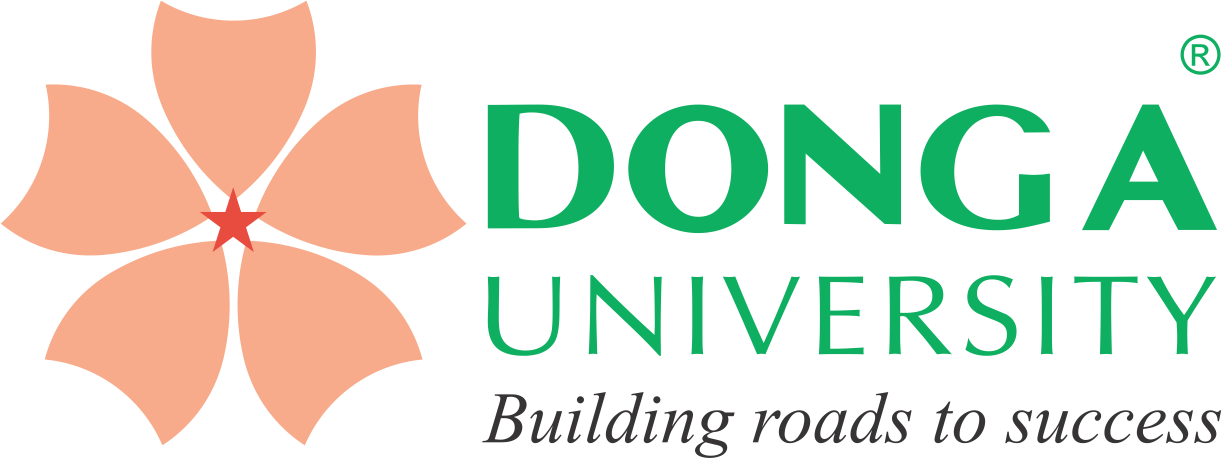
- Motto: "Building roads to success”, “Investing in knowledge to change your life"
- Type: Private university
- Established: 2002
- President: Dr Nguyễn Thị Anh Đào
- Location: Da Nang, Vietnam
- Website: donga.edu.vn

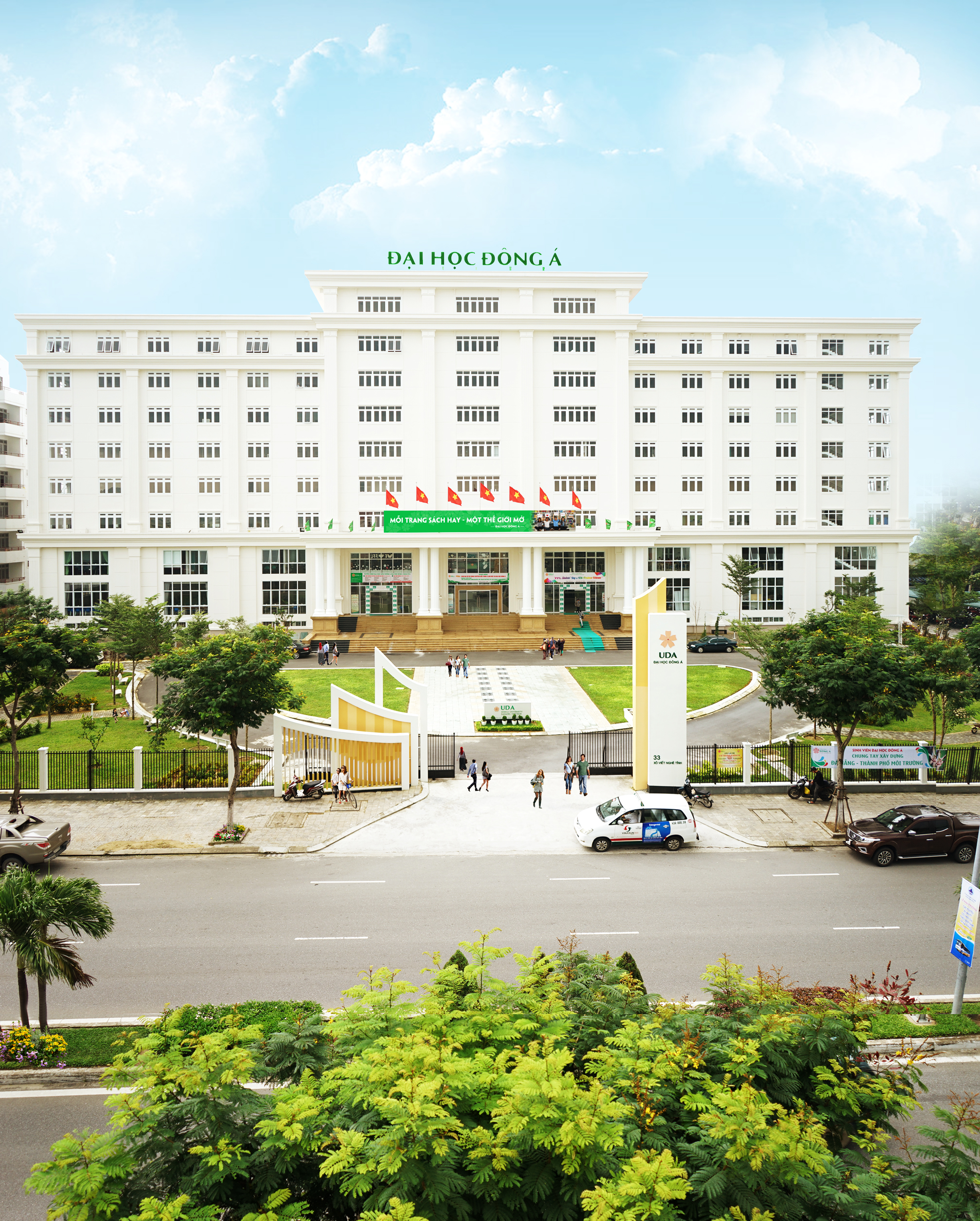

Đông Á University (Vietnamese: Đại học Đông Á) is a private and multidisciplinary university located in Da Nang, Vietnam. Originally founded as the Private Professional High School of Industrial Arts in January 2002, it became Đông Á University in May 2009. Its main campus is at 33 Xô Viết Nghệ Tĩnh; a second campus is located in Hoà Hải ward, Ngũ Hành Sơn District, a third campus was recently opened in Đắk Lắk province and additional campuses are under preparation in Quảng Nam province.

== History ==
The founder, Dr Nguyễn Thị Anh Đào, came from a poor mountainous village in Tam Kỳ, Quảng Nam province. She overcame the poverty of her time through education and eventually graduated from Huế University (now the Huế University of Sciences), where she also lectured. She also received an MA degree in Educational Management and was promoted to research student with honours.

She founded the university to contribute to the development of companies and to provide her own business and industry community with skilled employees. The university was established on January 28, 2002, with the name Private Professional High School of Industrial Arts. The school's motto at that time was “students’ success is teachers’ happiness, industry success is the school's happiness”. After a while, the Board of Management decided to focus the school's activities on serving the public instead, enhancing and expanding their training programs, educational activities and school facilities under the name of Đông Á University.
