= Masahiro Yanagida =

Japanese volleyball player (born 1992)

Personal information
- Nickname: Masa
- Born: 6 July 1992 (age 34) Edogawa, Tokyo
- Education: Keio University
- Height: 186 cm (6 ft 1 in)
- Weight: 80 kg (176 lb)
- Spike: 335 cm (132 in)
- Block: 305 cm (120 in)

Volleyball information
- Position: Wing Spiker / Outside Hitter
- Current club: Tokyo Great Bears
- Number: 8

Career
- Years: Team
- 2014–2017 2017–2018 2018–2019 2019–2020 2020–2022 2022–2023 2023–Present: (Japan) Suntory Sunbirds (Germany) Volleyball Bisons Bühl (Poland) Cuprum Lubin (Germany) United Volleys Frankfurt (Japan) Suntory Sunbirds (Japan) JTEKT Stings (Japan) Tokyo Great Bears

National team
- Years: Team
- 2014–2021, 2023: Japan
Medal record
Men's volleyball
Representing Japan
Asian Games
Silver medal – second place	2014 Incheon	Team
Bronze medal – third place	2022 Hangzhou	Team
Asian Championship
Gold medal – first place	2015 Tehran	Team
Gold medal – first place	2017 Gresik	Team
Bronze medal – third place	2019 Tehran	Team

Masahiro Yanagida (柳田 将洋, Yanagida Masahiro; born 6 July 1992) is a Japanese male volleyball player. He is a member of the Japan men's national volleyball team, playing Outside Hitter. At the club level he plays for the Tokyo Great Bears. Yanagida captained the senior national team from 2018 to 2021.

== Career ==
Yanagida started playing volleyball at 7 years old under the influence of his parents. While attending Toyo High School in 2010, his school participated in the 41st Spring High Tournament. He led his team to win the championships as the captain.

In 2011, he entered Keio University in the Faculty of Environment and Information studies.

He was registered as a member of Japan men's national volleyball team in 2013. In October of the same year, it was announced he would debut in the V.League (Japanese Volleyball League) with Suntory Sunbirds. He made his debut on 14 March 2015 by participating in the final 6 match against Panasonic Panthers.

On 24 April 2017 Suntory Sunbirds announced that Yanagida would leave the team at the Kurowashiki All Japan Volleyball Tournament and transfer overseas as a professional contract player.

On 21 June 2017 he announced that he would play overseas in Deutsche Volleyball-Bundesliga to Volleyball Bisons Buhl. He also signed a contract with Amuse Inc. He also entered in a contract with Asics.

On 10 April 2018 he became the captain of the Japan men's national volleyball team, until 2020. He was left out as part of the roster for the Tokyo Olympics.

On 8 June 2018 he extended his contract with Asics up to 31 March 2021.

On 26 July 2018 he announced on his social media that he would be signing a one-year contract with Cuprum Lubin for his debut in the Polish volleyball league, PlusLiga.

On 22 May 2019 a contract was signed with United Volleys Frankfurt, in the German league.

On 2 March 2020 he became a special advisor to the total body care brand "Doctor Air".

On 1 June 2020 he announced his comeback to the Japanese V.League through his old team, Suntory Sunbirds. On 7 June 2021 he announced that he renewed his contract with Suntory once again.

On 30 June, 2022, a contract was signed with JTEKT Stings for the 2022/23 season. Masahiro Yanagida contributed to the winning of the 2022 Emperor's Cup and was named MVP of the tournament.

In 2023, he returned to National team for the first time in two years. He was named as captain of B team of Japan national team that will participate the 2022 Asian Games.

Masahiro Yanagida signed with Tokyo Great Bears for 2023/24 season.

== Awards ==
=== Individual ===
- 2009 FIVB U19 World Championship — Best Spiker
- 2015–16 V.Premier League Men's — Rookie of the year
- German Bundesliga 2017/18 — Best Server
- German Cup 2017/18 — MVP
- 2020-21 V. League — Best 6
- 2021-22 V. League — Best 6
- The 70th Kurowashiki All Japan Volleyball Tournament — Best 6
- 2022 Asian Men's Club Volleyball Championship — Best 1st Outside Hitter
- 2022 Emperor's Cup — Most Valuable Player

=== Club ===
- 2020-21 V. League — Champion, with Suntory Sunbirds
- 2021-22 V. League — Champion, with Suntory Sunbirds
- 2022 Asian Men's Club Volleyball Championship — Runner-up, with Suntory Sunbirds
- 2022 Emperor's Cup — Champion, with JTEKT Stings
