= Tokyo Great Bears =

Japanese volleyball club

- Full name: Tokyo Great Bears 東京グレートベアーズ
- Founded: May 2022; 4 years ago
- Ground: Kōtō, Tokyo, Japan
- Owner: Nature Lab Co., Ltd. Great Bears Co., Ltd.
- Head Coach: (Finland) Kasper Vuorinen
- Captain: (Japan) Koichiro Koga
- League: SV.League
- 2025-26: 6th
- Website: Club home page

Uniforms
Home	Away

Tokyo Great Bears (Japanese: 東京グレートベアーズ) is the Japanese male volleyball club in the SV.League, the highest-tier volleyball league in Japan. Established in May 2022 by Nature Lab Co., Ltd. and would start competing in 2022–23 season.

== Concept ==
The team name means the players and supporters that are connected, comparable to the seven stars of the Big Dipper, which is part of Ursa Major. The club intend to connect people, regions, and the world through volleyball. They will envision a future that will make the volleyball world more exciting and attractive.

== History ==
In 2021, it was announced that FC Tokyo volleyball team would suspend the operations after the 2021–22 V. League season. But in May 2022, It was reported that the team was transferred to Nature Lab Co., Ltd. and established as the new team Tokyo Great Bears.

In the same month, Great Bears Co., Ltd. was founded as the management company for the club under Nature Lab and some players from FC Tokyo was also transferred to the club.

All players are offered professional contracts.

Tokyo Great Bears broke the V.League Division 1 attendance record with 8,142 fans in attendance for the game against JTEKT Stings at Ariake Coliseum.

== Team ==
=== Current roster ===
As of November 2026

Team roster – season 2025/2026
No.	Player Name	Position	Date of birth	Height
2	(Japan) Riku Ito	Middle Blocker	14 November 2001 (age 24)	1.95 m (6 ft 5 in)
3	(Japan) Fukatsu Akihiro	Setter	23 July 1987 (age 39)	1.83 m (6 ft 0 in)
4	(Slovenia) Jan Kozamernik	Middle Blocker	24 December 1995 (age 30)	2.04 m (6 ft 8 in)
6	(Poland) Bartosz Kurek	Opposite Hitter	29 August 1988 (age 38)	2.05 m (6 ft 9 in)
8	(Japan) Masahiro Yanagida	Outside Hitter	6 July 1992 (age 34)	1.86 m (6 ft 1 in)
10	(Japan) Taichirō Koga (c)	Libero	4 October 1989 (age 37)	1.70 m (5 ft 7 in)
11	(Japan) Rikuto Goto	Outside Hitter	13 May 2001 (age 25)	1.87 m (6 ft 2 in)
12	(Japan) Go Murayama	Middle Blocker	30 July 1998 (age 28)	1.92 m (6 ft 4 in)
13	(Japan) Issei Otake	Middle Blocker	3 December 1995 (age 30)	2.02 m (6 ft 8 in)
17	(Argentina) Luciano Vicentin	Outside Hitter	4 April 2000 (age 26)	1.99 m (6 ft 6 in)
20	(Israel) Mark Rura	Opposite Hitter	23 January 2006 (age 20)	2.07 m (6 ft 9 in)
29	(Japan) Ryuki Ohmae	Libero	21 November 2002 (age 23)	1.74 m (5 ft 9 in)
30	(Japan) Takuma Kawano	Outside Hitter	25 July 2006 (age 20)	1.97 m (6 ft 6 in)
31	(Japan) Ryusei Kurokawa	Setter	31 May 2002 (age 24)	1.77 m (5 ft 10 in)
32	(Japan) Ranmaru Kondo	Setter	22 October 2003 (age 23)	1.78 m (5 ft 10 in)
39	(Japan) Yusaku Takashima	Opposite Hitter	31 January 2004 (age 22)	1.89 m (6 ft 2 in)
Head coach: (Brazil) Mauricio Paes

=== Former roster ===
Team roster – season 2025/2026
No.	Player Name	Date of birth	Position
1	(Poland) Bartosz Kurek	August 29, 1988 (age 38)	Opposite hitter
3	(Japan) Fukatsu Akihiro	July 23, 1987 (age 39)	Setter
4	(Slovenia) Jan Kozamernik	December 24, 1995 (age 30)	Middle blocker
5	(Japan) Wataru Taniguchi	November 5, 1996 (age 30)	Libero
6	(Portugal) Alex Ferreira	November 13, 1991 (age 35)	Outside hitter
8	(Japan) Masahiro Yanagida	July 6, 1992 (age 34)	Outside hitter
9	(Japan) Takahiro Tozaki	June 14, 1995 (age 31)	Outside hitter
10	(Japan) Taichirō Koga (c)	October 4, 1989 (age 37)	Libero
12	(Japan) Go Murayama	July 30, 1998 (age 28)	Middle blocker
13	(Japan) Issei Otake	December 3, 1995 (age 30)	Middle blocker
15	(Japan) Yuki Imahashi	December 25, 2000 (age 25)	Setter
17	(Argentina) Luciano Vicentin	April 4, 2000 (age 26)	Outside hitter
25	(Japan) Rikuto Goto	May 13, 2001 (age 25)	Outside hitter
26	(Japan) Riku Ito	November 14, 2001 (age 24)	Middle blocker
29	(Japan) Ryuki Ohmae	November 21, 2002 (age 23)	Libero
31	(Japan) Ryusei Kurokawa	May 31, 2002 (age 24)	Setter
39	(Japan) Yusaku Takashima	January 31, 2004 (age 22)	Opposite hitter
Head coach: (Finland) Kasper Vuorinen

Team roster – season 2023/2024
No.	Player Name	Date of birth	Position
1	(Japan) Hidetomo Hoshino	September 29, 1990 (age 36)	Outside hitter
2	(Japan) Kentaro Tamaya	January 30, 1992 (age 34)	Setter
3	(Japan) Fukatsu Akihiro	July 23, 1987 (age 39)	Setter
6	(Japan) Hideyuki Kuriyama	July 15, 1993 (age 33)	Middle Blocker
7	(Japan) Kouhei Yanagisawa	May 24, 1993 (age 33)	Outside hitter
8	(Japan) Masahiro Yanagida	July 6, 1992 (age 34)	Outside hitter
9	(Japan) Takahiro Tozaki	June 14, 1995 (age 31)	Outside hitter
10	(Japan) Taichirō Koga (c)	October 4, 1989 (age 37)	Libero
11	(Japan) Daigo Yamada	April 11, 1998 (age 28)	Middle blocker
12	(Japan) Hirotaka Odashima	July 22, 1991 (age 35)	Middle Blocker
13	(Japan) Hayata Yanagimachi	June 17, 1996 (age 30)	Opposite Spiker
14	(Japan) Shin Tehara	April 14, 1993 (age 33)	Setter
15	(Japan) Yuki Imahashi	December 25, 2000 (age 25)	Setter
16	(Japan) Takumi Kameyama	February 27, 2001 (age 25)	Outside Hitter
17	(Japan) Shingo Kasari	January 29, 1997 (age 29)	Outside hitter
18	(Japan) Tetsuya Muto	November 5, 1997 (age 29)	Middle Blocker
20	(Brazil) Rafael Araújo	June 13, 1991 (age 35)	Opposite hitter
28	(Japan) Kandai Goto	January 25, 2003 (age 23)	Libero
Head coach: (Finland) Kasper Vuorinen

Team roster – season 2022/2023
No.	Player Name	Date of birth	Position
1	(Japan) Hidetomo Hoshino	September 29, 1990 (age 36)	Outside hitter
2	(Japan) Kentaro Tamaya	January 30, 1992 (age 34)	Setter
3	(Japan) Shohei Nose	July 20, 1993 (age 33)	Libero
4	(Japan) Yuma Nagamoto	December 22, 1991 (age 34)	Opposite Spiker
5	(Japan) Wataru Taniguchi	November 5, 1996	Outside Hitter
6	(China) Zhang Binglong	September 11, 1994 (age 32)	Outside hitter
7	(Japan) Kouhei Yanagisawa	May 24, 1993 (age 33)	Outside hitter
8	(Japan) Hideyuki Kuriyama	July 15, 1993 (age 33)	Middle Blocker
9	(Japan) Takahiro Tozaki	June 14, 1995 (age 31)	Outside hitter
10	(Japan) Taichirō Koga (c)	October 4, 1989 (age 37)	Libero
11	(Japan) Daigo Yamada	April 11, 1998 (age 28)	Middle blocker
12	(Japan) Hirotaka Odashima	July 22, 1991 (age 35)	Middle Blocker
13	(Japan) Hayata Yanagimachi	June 17, 1996 (age 30)	Opposite Spiker
14	(Japan) Shin Tehara	April 14, 1993 (age 33)	Setter
15	(Japan) Yuki Imahashi In	December 25, 2000 (age 25)	Setter
16	(Japan) Takumi Kameyama In	February 27, 2001 (age 25)	Outside Hitter
17	(Japan) Shingo Kasari	January 29, 1997 (age 29)	Outside hitter
18	(Japan) Tetsuya Muto	November 5, 1997 (age 29)	Middle Blocker
20	(Brazil) Rafael Araújo	June 13, 1991 (age 35)	Opposite hitter
21	(Japan) Ryosuke Hirata	May 18, 1995 (age 31)	Middle Blocker
26	(Japan) Ayato Kuroda	January 30, 1996 (age 30)	Outside Hitter
Head coach : (Japan) Koichiro Shimbo

== Head coach history ==
Name	Years
(Japan) Koichiro Shimbo	2022-2023
(Finland) Kasper Vuorinen	2023-Present

== Notable players ==
(Brazil) Rafael Araújo (2022)

(Poland) Bartosz Kurek (2025)

== Results ==
=== League result ===
Champion Runner-up

League		Position	Teams	Matches	Win	Lose
V.League Division 1	2022–23 season	8th	10	36	10	26
SV.League	2024-25	5th	10	44	23	21
SV.League	2025-26	6th	10	44	21	23
