= Osaka Blazers Sakai =

Japanese volleyball club

Nippon Steel Sakai Blazers
- Short name: Nippon Steel Sakai BZ
- Founded: 1939
- Ground: Sakai City, Osaka, Japan.
- Manager Head coach: (Japan) Mikiyasu Tanaka (Japan) Shinya Chiba
- Captain: (Japan) Takashi Dekita
- League: SV.League
- 2025–26: 7th place
- Website: Club home page

Uniforms
Home	Away

Osaka Blazers Sakai is a men's professional volleyball team based in Sakai city, Osaka, Japan. It plays in the V.Premier League.

The club was founded in 1939 as part of the Kitakyushu, Fukuoka-based Yawata Steel athletic club which also included football club Yawata Steel F.C. In 1969 the volleyball section split and moved to Sakai.

On October 2, 2023, the club changed its name into Nippon Steel Sakai Blazers.

== Honours ==
Japan Volleyball League/V.League/V.Premier League

- Champions (17): 1967-1968 1973-1974 1974-1975 1975-1976 1976-1977 1978-1979 1979-1980 1980-1981 1982-1983 1988-1989 1989-1990 1990-1991 1996-1997 1997-1998 2005-2006, 2010–11, 2012–13
- Runners-up (4): 1994-95,1995–96, 2008–09 and 2009–10

Kurowashiki All Japan Volleyball Championship

- Champions (14): 1952 1953 1957 1960 1967 1974 1975 1976 1977 1980 1984 1988 1989 1990

Emperor's Cup

- Runner-up (2): 2007, 2021

== Current roster ==
The following is team roster of 2026/27 SV.League as of November 2026

No.	Player Name	Date of birth	Position	Height
2	(Japan) Hiroyuki Yamane	March 14, 2003 (age 23)	Middle Blocker	1.91 m (6 ft 3 in)
3	(Japan) Kosuke Yasui	December 8, 2000 (age 25)	Outside Hitter	1.89 m (6 ft 2 in)
6	(Japan) Aiki Mori	April 19, 1998 (age 28)	Libero	1.70 m (5 ft 7 in)
7	(Japan) Kenta Takanashi	March 25, 1997 (age 29)	Outside Hitter	1.90 m (6 ft 3 in)
8	(Japan) Naoto Akima	September 19, 2000 (age 26)	Middle Blocker	2.01 m (6 ft 7 in)
9	(Japan) Masaki Oya (c)	April 23, 1995 (age 31)	Setter	1.77 m (5 ft 10 in)
10	(Japan) Cole Watanabe	April 6, 2000 (age 26)	Middle Blocker	1.93 m (6 ft 4 in)
15	(Japan) Takumi Eto	June 28, 2000 (age 26)	Setter	1.80 m (5 ft 11 in)
17	(Japan) Ryunosuke Kamimura	April 19, 2001 (age 25)	Opposite Hitter	1.86 m (6 ft 1 in)
18	(Estonia) Alex Saaremaa	December 18, 2000 (age 25)	Middle Blocker	2.10 m (6 ft 11 in)
20	(Japan) Takehiro Nakanishi	September 9, 2002 (age 24)	Setter	1.81 m (5 ft 11 in)
21	(Japan) Yutaro Takemoto	February 21, 1995 (age 31)	Middle Blocker	1.99 m (6 ft 6 in)
22	(Japan) Akira Kakizaki	April 16, 2002 (age 24)	Outside Hitter	1.86 m (6 ft 1 in)
23	(Japan) Tatsuki Minamiguchi	April 18, 2003 (age 23)	Libero	1.70 m (5 ft 7 in)
77	(Brazil) Chizoba Neves	July 25, 1997 (age 29)	Opposite Hitter	2.00 m (6 ft 7 in)
90	(Italy) Tommaso Rinaldi	November 9, 2001 (age 25)	Outside Hitter	2.00 m (6 ft 7 in)
99	(Spain) Jordi Ramon	July 9, 1999 (age 27)	Outside Hitter	1.94 m (6 ft 4 in)
Head coach: (Brazil) Gerson de Oliveira Amorin

=== Former roster ===
Team roster – season 2023/2024
No.	Player Name	Date of birth	Position
1	(Japan) Yoshihiko Matsumoto	January 7, 1981 (age 45)	Middle blocker
2	(Japan) Yuki Higuchi	April 27, 1996 (age 30)	Outside hitter
3	(Japan) Kosuke Yasui	December 8, 2000 (age 25)	Outside hitter
4	(Japan) Naoya Takano	April 30, 1993 (age 33)	Outside hitter
5	(Japan) Tomohiro Horie	June 23, 1997 (age 29)	Libero
6	(Japan) Aiki Mori	April 19, 1998 (age 28)	Libero
7	(Japan) Takashi Dekita	August 13, 1991 (age 35)	Middle blocker
8	(Japan) Naoto Akima	September 19, 2000 (age 26)	Middle blocker
9	(Japan) Hiroshi Sakoda	May 1, 1996 (age 30)	Outside hitter
10	(Japan) Cole Hogland	April 6, 2000 (age 26)	Middle blocker
11	(Japan) Shigetome Hyuga	October 25, 1999 (age 27)	Outside hitter
13	(Canada) Sharone Vernon-Evans	August 28, 1998 (age 28)	Opposite hitter
14	(Japan) Shohei Yamaguchi (c)	July 21, 1994 (age 32)	Setter
18	(Japan) Rintaro Umemoto	April 9, 1998 (age 28)	Middle blocker
21	(Japan) Yutaro Takemoto	February 21, 1995 (age 31)	Middle blocker
22	(Japan) Akahoshi Shinjo	January 19, 2000 (age 26)	Setter
23	(Japan) Yukiya Uno	June 28, 1996 (age 30)	Outside hitter
Head coach: (Japan) Shinya Chiba

Team roster – season 2022/2023
No.	Player Name	Date of birth	Position
1	(Japan) Yoshihiko Matsumoto	January 7, 1981 (age 45)	Middle blocker
2	(Japan) Yuki Higuchi	April 27, 1996 (age 30)	Outside hitter
3	(Japan) Kosuke Yasui In	December 8, 2000 (age 25)	Outside hitter
4	(Japan) Naoya Takano	April 30, 1993 (age 33)	Outside hitter
5	(Japan) Tomohiro Horie	June 23, 1997 (age 29)	Libero
7	(Japan) Takashi Dekita (c)	August 13, 1991 (age 35)	Middle blocker
8	(Japan) Naoto Akima In	September 19, 2000 (age 26)	Middle blocker
9	(Japan) Hiroshi Sakoda	May 1, 1996 (age 30)	Outside hitter
11	(Japan) Shigetome Hyuga	October 25, 1999 (age 27)	Outside hitter
13	(Canada) Sharone Vernon-Evans	August 28, 1998 (age 28)	Opposite hitter
14	(Japan) Shohei Yamaguchi	July 21, 1994 (age 32)	Setter
17	(Japan) Akihiro Fukatsu	July 23, 1987 (age 39)	Setter
18	(Japan) Rintaro Umemoto	April 9, 1998 (age 28)	Middle blocker
20	(Japan) Tomohiro Yamamoto	November 5, 1994 (age 32)	Libero
21	(Japan) Yutaro Takemoto	February 21, 1995 (age 31)	Middle blocker
22	(Japan) Akahoshi Shinjo	January 19, 2000 (age 26)	Setter
23	(Japan) Yukiya Uno	June 28, 1996 (age 30)	Outside hitter
Head coach: (Japan) Shinya Chiba

== League results ==
Champion Runner-up

League		Position	Teams	Matches	Win	Lose
V.League
V.League	1st (1994–95)	Runner-up	8	21	10	11
V.League	2nd (1995–96)	Runner-up	8	21	13	8
V.League	3rd (1996–97)	Champion	8	21	14	7
V.League	4th (1997–98)	Champion	8	21	17	4
V.League	5th (1998–99)	6th	10	18	10	8
V.League	6th (1999-00)	4th	10	18	15	3
V.League	7th (2000–01)	5th	10	18	10	8
V.League	8th (2001–02)	3rd	10	18	12	6
V.League	9th (2002–03)	6th	8	21	8	13
V.League	10th (2003–04)	4th	8	21	12	9
V.League	11th (2004–05)	6th	8	28	11	17
V.League	12th (2005–06)	Champion	8	28	17	11
V・Premier	2006-07	6th	8	28	9	19
V・Premier	2007-08	4th	8	28	15	13
V・Premier	2008-09	Runner-up	8	28	15	13
V・Premier	2009-10	Runner-up	8	28	18	10
V・Premier	2010-11	Champion	8	24	19	5
V・Premier	2011-12	4th	8	21	13	8
V・Premier	2012-13	Champion	8	28	17	11
V・Premier	2013-14	3rd	8	28	19	9
V・Premier	2014-15	4th	8	21	8	13
V・Premier	2015-16	6th	8	21	10	11
V・Premier	2016-17	6th	8	21	8	13
V・Premier	2017–18	7th	8	21	7	14
V.League Division 1	2018–19	6th	10	32	16	16
V.League Division 1	2019–20	5th	10	28	15	13
V.League Division 1	2020–21	7th	10	36	17	19
V.League Division 1	2021–22	5th	10	36	24	12
V.League Division 1	2022–23	4th	10	39	24	15
SV.League	2024-25	7th	10	44	15	29
SV.League	2025-26	7th	10	44	17	27
