= Oita Miyoshi Weisse Adler =

Men's volleyball team based in Oita City, Oita, Japan

- Full name: Oita Miyoshi Weisse Adler
- Founded: 1994
- Ground: TOTO Oita Factory Gymnasium
- Chairman: (Japan) Hiroshi Miyoshi
- Head coach: (Zimbabwe) Murray Pole
- League: V.League Division 2
- 2022–2023: 10 (Note: In V.League Division 1)
- Website: Club home page

Oita Miyoshi Weisse Adler (大分三好ヴァイセアドラー) is a men's volleyball team based in Oita City, Oita, Japan. Prior to its suspension of activities and withdrawal in May 2024, the team played in V.League Division 2, the second-level Japanese volleyball league. It represented Japan at the 2014 Asian Men's Club Volleyball Championship.

== History ==
Oita Miyoshi Weisse Adler was founded in 1994 by the Miyoshi Clinic of Internal Medicine and Cardiology. Originally called Miyoshi Cardiology EKG, then Miyoshi Cardiology EKG Oita, the team was named "Weisse Adler", meaning "white eagles" in German, for the characters "white eagle" (白鷲, shirawashi) in the name of the Seiun Shirawashi Association (青雲白鷲会) of the clinic. The founder, Hiroshi Miyoshi, was the director of the hospital and was also involved in the management of the team. Most of the team also worked at the hospital. It originally had nine members.

After placing first in the V1 League in the 2005–2006 season, the franchise was promoted to the V.Premier League in 2006. The team was demoted to the V.Challenge League in 2009. In 2014, it represented Japan at the 2014 Asian Men's Club Volleyball Championship in the Philippines. Oita Miyoshi Weisse Adler was demoted to V.League Division 2 after losing the V.Challenge match of the 2022–23 season to Voreas Hokkaido.

In March 2024, the founder died and the club had difficulty continuing operations. The next month, the franchise announced the suspension of all activities and their withdrawal from the new V.League in late May as they were unable to find a company to transfer the team to.

== Honours ==
V.Premier League

- Champion (0):
- Runners-up (0):

All Japan Volleyball Championship

- Champions (0):
- Runners-up (0):

Emperor's Cup

- Champion (0):

== League results ==
Champions Runners-up

| League | | Position | Teams | Matches | Win | Lose |
|---|---|---|---|---|---|---|
| V・Premier | 2006-07 | 8th | 8 | 28 | 2 | 26 |
| V・Premier | 2007–08 | 8th | 8 | 28 | 2 | 26 |
| V・Premier | 2008–09 | 8th | 8 | 28 | 3 | 25 |
| V・Premier | 2009–10 | 7th | 8 | 28 | 4 | 24 |
| V・Premier | 2010–11 | 8th | 8 | 24 | 3 | 21 |
| V・Premier | 2011–12 | 8th | 8 | 21 | 3 | 18 |
| V・Premier | 2012–13 | 8th | 8 | 28 | 5 | 23 |
V・Challenge
| V・Challenge | 2013–14 | Runner-up | 11 | 20 | 17 | 3 |
| V・Challenge | 2014–15 | Champion | 12 | 22 | 19 | 3 |
V・Challenge 1
| V・Challenge 1 | 2015–16 | Runners-up | 8 | 21 | 18 | 3 |
| V・Challenge 1 | 2016–17 | Champion | 8 | 21 | 18 | 3 |
| V・Challenge 1 | 2017–18 | Runners-up | 8 | 21 | 15 | 6 |
| V.League Division 1 | 2018–19 | 9th | 10 | 27 | 4 | 23 |
| V.League Division 1 | 2019–20 | 9th | 10 | 27 | 3 | 24 |
| V.League Division 1 | 2020–21 | 10th | 10 | 36 | 3 | 33 |
| V.League Division 1 | 2021–22 | 9th | 10 | 36 | 6 | 30 |
| V.League Division 1 | 2022–23 | 10th | 10 | 36 | 5 | 31 |

== Current squad ==
The following is the team roster of the 2022–2023 season.

2022–2023 season team roster
| No. | Name | Position | Date of birth | Height (m) | Weight (kg) | Spike (cm) |
|---|---|---|---|---|---|---|
| 2 | (Kenya) Enock Some | Opposite hitter | 30 October 1997 (age 28) | 2.01 m (6 ft 7 in) | 90 kg (200 lb) | 360 |
| 3 | (Japan) Abe Ryota | Outside hitter | 3 April 1989 (age 36) | 1.88 m (6 ft 2 in) | 78 kg (172 lb) | 345 |
| 4 | (Thailand) Kantapat Koonmee | Outside hitter | 17 April 1998 (age 27) | 2.04 m (6 ft 8 in) | 87 kg (192 lb) | 355 |
| 5 | (Japan) Motoyuki Onishi | Middle blocker | 29 March 1996 (age 29) | 1.98 m (6 ft 6 in) | 91 kg (201 lb) | 335 |
| 6 | (Japan) Ryusuke Nakamura | Middle blocker | 26 December 1997 (age 27) | 1.94 m (6 ft 4 in) | 84 kg (185 lb) | 338 |
| 7 | (Japan) Takemune Ogawa | Libero | 22 September 1998 (age 27) | 1.75 m (5 ft 9 in) | 72 kg (159 lb) | 315 |
| 8 | (Japan) Kyogo Kawaguchi | Middle blocker | 22 March 1997 (age 28) | 1.98 m (6 ft 6 in) | 83 kg (183 lb) | 335 |
| 10 | (Japan) Kota Yamada | Outside hitter | 25 November 1997 (age 28) | 1.75 m (5 ft 9 in) | 75 kg (165 lb) | 335 |
| 11 | (Japan) Hiroki Ito | Setter | 26 June 1999 (age 26) | 1.90 m (6 ft 3 in) | 85 kg (187 lb) | 332 |
| 12 | (Japan) Shohei Ono | Outside hitter | 25 April 1999 (age 26) | 1.87 m (6 ft 2 in) | 77 kg (170 lb) | 330 |
| 13 | (Japan) Masato Kubota | Libero | 7 August 1992 (age 33) | 1.77 m (5 ft 10 in) | 79 kg (174 lb) | 320 |
| 14 | (Japan) Shota Fujiwara | Outside hitter | 14 July 1998 (age 27) | 1.90 m (6 ft 3 in) | 84 kg (185 lb) | 330 |
| 15 | (Japan) Shodai Abe | Middle blocker | 3 November 1999 (age 26) | 1.90 m (6 ft 3 in) | 86 kg (190 lb) | 335 |
| 16 | (Japan) Yutaka Hamamoto | Outside hitter | 5 July 1993 (age 32) | 1.90 m (6 ft 3 in) | 82 kg (181 lb) | 335 |
| 18 | (Japan) Kenta Koga | Opposite hitter | 17 September 1997 (age 28) | 1.88 m (6 ft 2 in) | 75 kg (165 lb) | 335 |
| 20 | (Japan) Toshiaki Nagao | Outside hitter | 3 May 2001 (age 24) | 1.79 m (5 ft 10 in) | 78 kg (172 lb) | 330 |
| 21 | (Japan) Naoki Inokuchi | Setter | 27 April 1997 (age 28) | 1.73 m (5 ft 8 in) | 65 kg (143 lb) | 315 |
| 22 | (Japan) Kurama Fujioka | Setter | 4 October 1993 (age 32) | 1.77 m (5 ft 10 in) | 72 kg (159 lb) | 315 |
Head coach: (Zimbabwe) Murray Pole

== Notable players ==
Foreign players

Philippines

- Marck Jesus Espejo (2018–2019)
- Bryan Bagunas (2019–2022)

Thailand

- Kantapat Koonmee (2022–)

Venezuela

- Emerson Rodriguez (2021–2022)
