= University of East Asia =

Private university in Shimonoseki, Japan

Coordinates: 33°59′59″N 130°56′55″E

- 東亜大学
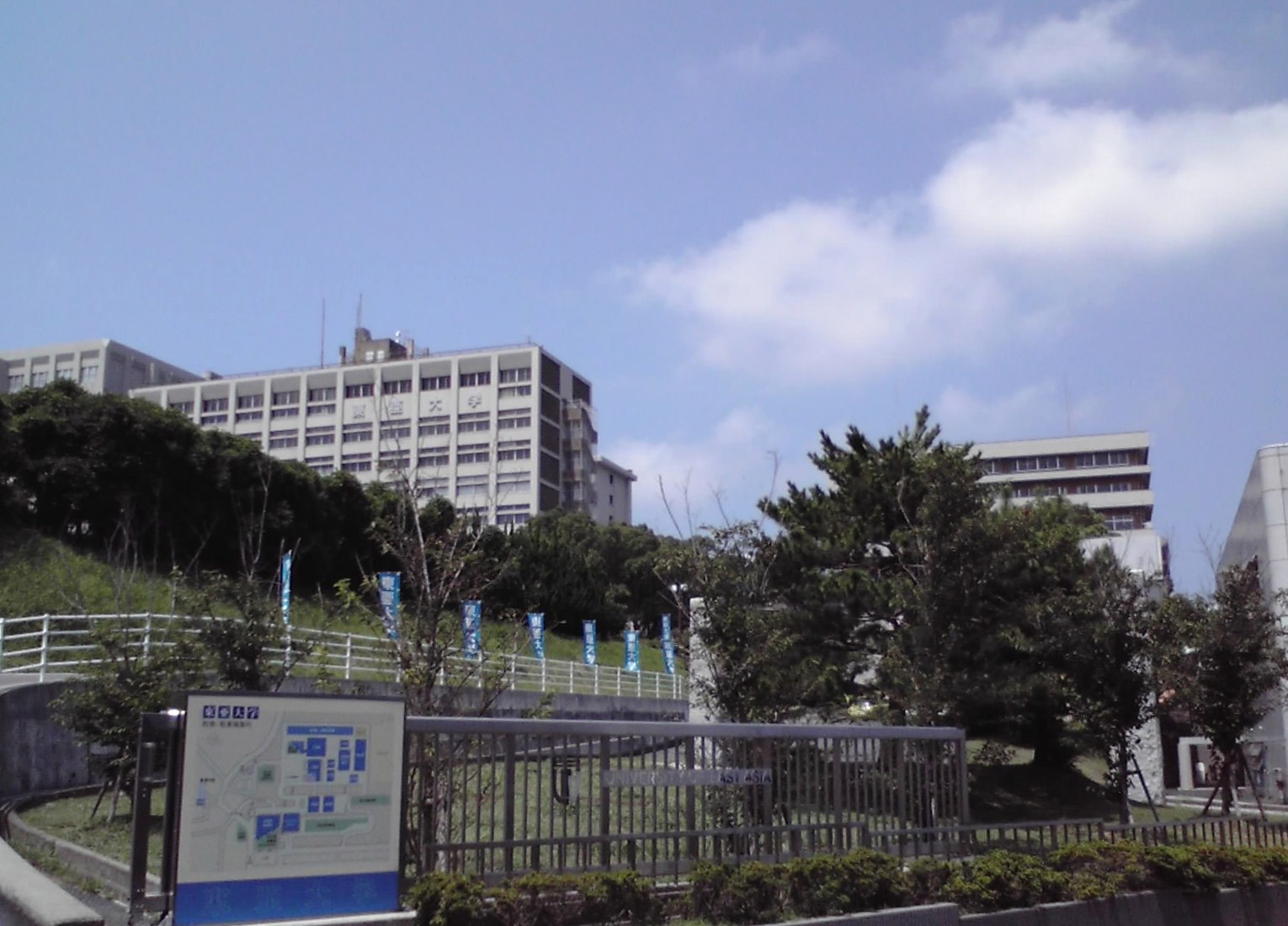
- Type: Private
- Established: 1966
- Location: Shimonoseki, Yamaguchi, Japan
- Campus: Urban
- Mascot: None
- Website: www.toua-u.ac.jp

The University of East Asia (東亜大学, Tōa daigaku) is a private university in Shimonoseki, Yamaguchi, Japan, established in 1974.

== Faculties (Undergraduate Schools) ==
=== Faculty of Human Sciences ===
- Department of Humanities and Social Sciences
  - Psychology Course
  - Child Development Course
  - Culture and Tourism Course
- Department of Sports and Health Sciences
  - Sports and Health Sciences Course
  - Sports Management Course

=== Faculty of Medical Technology ===
- Department of Medical Engineering
  - Medical Engineering Course
  - Emergency Medical Lifesaving Course
  - Medical Information Course
  - Social Welfare Course
- Department of Human Nutrition Care

=== Faculty of Design ===
- Department of Design
  - Animation and Graphic Design Course
  - Interior Design Course
  - Art Course
  - System Design Engineering Course
- Department of Total Beauty
  - Beauty + Haircut Course
  - Esthetics Course
  - Fashion Environment Course

== Campus ==
- Shin-Shimonoseki

== Research institute ==
- Counseling and Research Center for Clinical Psychology

== Institutes ==
- University Library
- Career Center
- International Student Center(留学生相談センター)
- Gymnasium

== See also ==
- Shin-Shimonoseki Station
- Shimonoseki City
