= 2018–19 V.League Division 1 Men's =

- League: V.League Division 1
- Sport: Volleyball
- Duration: Oct 26, 2018 – Apr 14, 2019
- Games: 135 (Regular round); 19 (Final stage)
- Teams: 10
- Total attendance: 174,516

2018–2019
- Season champions: Panasonic Panthers
- Season MVP: Michał Kubiak
- Top scorer: Dmitry Muserskiy
- Runners-up: JT Thunders

Men's V.League Division 1 seasons
- 2017–18 2019–20

The Volleyball 2018–19 V.League Division 1 Men's was the 25th tournament year and the 1st top level men's tournament of the newly branded and reorganized V.League (Japan). It was held from October 26, 2018 – April 14, 2019.

== Clubs ==
Locations of the 2018–19 V.League Division 1 Men's clubs

=== Personnel ===
2018–19 V.League Division 1 Men's Personnel
Club	Head coach	Captain	Province/City	Colors	Main Sponsor
Panasonic Panthers	(Japan) Hiroyuki Furuta	(Japan) Hideomi Fukatsu	Hirakata, Osaka		Panasonic
Toyoda Gosei Trefuerza	(Sweden) Anders Kristiansson	(Japan) Koichiro Koga	Inazawa, Aichi		Toyoda Machine Works
Toray Arrows	(Japan) Shinoda Ayumu	(Japan) Hidetomo Hoshino	Mishima, Shizuoka		Toray Industries
JT Thunders	(Montenegro) Veselin Vuković	(Japan) Shohei Yamamoto	Hiroshima, Hiroshima		Japan Tobacco
Suntory Sunbirds	(Japan) Daisuke Sakai	(Japan) Kenya Fujinaka	Minoh, Osaka		Suntory
JTEKT Stings	(Japan) Tomoaki Wakayama	(Japan) Hiroaki Asano	Kariya, Aichi		JTEKT
Osaka Blazers Sakai	(Japan) Toru Uesugi	(Japan) Shohei Yamaguchi	Sakai, Osaka		Nippon Steel & Sumitomo Metal
FC Tokyo	(Japan) Masayasu Sakamoto	(Japan) Yuma Nagatomo	Sumida, Tokyo		Tokyo Gas
Oita Miyoshi Weisse Adler	(Japan) Kobayashi Naoto	(Japan) Shingo Takayama	Oita, Oita		The Oita Bank Ltd.
VC Nagano Tridents	(Iran) Ahmad Masajedi	(Japan) Isamu Kuriki	Takamori, Nagano		Jermo Corporation Ltd.

=== Foreign players ===
The total number of foreign players is restricted to one per club. Player from Asian Volleyball Confederation (AVC) nations are exempt from these restrictions.

2018–19 V.League Division 1 Men's Foreign Players
Club	Player	Other
Panasonic Panthers	(Poland) Michał Kubiak (CEV)	(Chinese Taipei) Chen Chien-Chen (AVC)
Toyoda Gosei Trefuerza	(Croatia) Igor Omrčen (CEV)	—N/a
Toray Arrows	(France) Antonin Rouzier (CEV)	(Myanmar) Aung Thu (AVC)
JT Thunders	—N/a	(China) Liu Libin (AVC) (Australia) Thomas Edgar (AVC)
Suntory Sunbirds	(Russia) Dmitry Muserskiy (CEV)	—N/a
JTEKT Stings	(Bulgaria) Valentin Bratoev (CEV)	(China) Qin Zhen (AVC)
Osaka Blazers Sakai	(North Macedonia) Nikola Gjorgiev (CEV)	—N/a
FC Tokyo	(Canada) Jason DeRocco (NORCECA)	—N/a
Oita Miyoshi Weisse Adler	(Rwanda) Yakan Guma (CAVB)	(Philippines) Marck Jesus Espejo (AVC)
VC Nagano Tridents	(Russia) Artem Kiselev (CEV)	—N/a

=== Transfer players ===
Player	Moving from	Moving to
(Chinese Taipei) Chen Chien-Chen	(Japan) Voreas Hokkaido	(Japan) Panasonic Panthers
(Japan) Takahiro Shin	(Japan) Fujitsu Kawasaki Red Spirits	(Japan) Panasonic Panthers
(Japan) Yuichiro Komiya	(Japan) Toray Arrows	(Japan) Panasonic Panthers
(Japan) Issei Otake	(Germany) United Volleys Frankfurt	(Japan) Panasonic Panthers
(Japan) Yosuke Arai	(Japan) Toyoda Gosei Trefuerza	(Thailand) Air Force
(France) Antonin Rouzier	(France) Lycée Jean Perrin	(Japan) Toray Arrows
(Japan) Yuta Abe	(Japan) Suntory Sunbirds	(Japan) Toray Arrows
(Myanmar) Aung Thu	(Thailand) Nakhon Ratchasima	(Japan) Toray Arrows
(Canada) Gavin Schmitt	(Japan) Toray Arrows	(Greece) Olympiacos S.C.
(Japan) Shinpei Goda	(Japan) Panasonic Panthers	(Japan) JT Thunders
(China) Liu Libin	(France) Tourcoing Lille Métropole Volley-Ball	(Japan) JT Thunders
(Cuba) Yadrian Escobar Silva	(Japan) Suntory Sunbirds	(Argentina) Club Ciudad de Bolívar
(Russia) Dmitry Muserskiy	(Russia) VC Belogorie	(Japan) Suntory Sunbirds
(Bulgaria) Valentin Bratoev	(Bulgaria) CSKA Sofia	(Japan) JTEKT Stings
(China) Qin Zhen	(China) Tianjin Volleyball	(Japan) JTEKT Stings
(Japan) Ryuta Homma	(Japan) JTEKT Stings	(France) Paris Volley
(Bulgaria) Matey Kaziyski	(Japan) JTEKT Stings	(Poland) Stocznia Szczecin
(Brazil) Wallace Martins	(Japan) Osaka Blazers Sakai	(Brazil) SESI-SP
(Japan) Masahiro Sekita	(Japan) Panasonic Panthers	(Japan) Osaka Blazers Sakai
(North Macedonia) Nikola Gjorgiev	(Poland) ONICO Warszawa	(Japan) Osaka Blazers Sakai
(Japan) Tomohiro Yamamoto	(Japan) FC Tokyo	(Japan) Osaka Blazers Sakai
(Bosnia and Herzegovina) Milan Pepić	(Japan) FC Tokyo	(France) GFCA Volley-Ball Ajaccio
(Canada) Jason DeRocco	(Poland) Jastrzębski Węgiel	(Japan) FC Tokyo
(Japan) Matsuo Keisuke	(Japan) Tsukuba United Sun GAIA	(Japan) Oita Miyoshi Weisse Adler
(Philippines) Marck Jesus Espejo	(Philippines) Cignal HD Spikers	(Japan) Oita Miyoshi Weisse Adler
(Russia) Artem Kiselev	(Russia) Kristall Voronezh	(Japan) VC Nagano Tridents

== Stadiums ==
Regular Round
Leg 1	Leg 2
Park Arena Komaki; Kanaoka Park Gymnasium; Matsumoto City Gymnasium; Ota City General Gymnasium; Fukui Prefectural Gymnasium; Kure City General Gymnasium Wing Arena Kariya; Sumida City Gymnasium; Mishima Citizen Gymnasium; Osaka Municipal Gymnasium; Kusanagi General Gymnasium; Oita Prefectural General Stadium	Panasonic Arena; Park Arena Komaki; Tokushima Gymnasium; Komazawa Gymnasium; Sumida City Gymnasium; Kitakyushu General Stadium Okinawa City Gymnasium; Rose Arena Indoor Stadium; Hiroshima Prefectural Center; Kusanagi General Gymnasium; Oita Prefectural General Stadium; Matsue City General Gymnasium
2018–19 V.League Division 1 Men's is located in Japan
Regular Round	Final stage
Leg 3	Final stage
Wing Arena Kariya; Kanaoka Park Gymnasium; Matsumoto City Gymnasium; Ota City General Gymnasium; Kumamoto Prefectural Gymnasium; Wakayama Prefectural Gymnasium Panasonic Arena; JTEKT Arena Nara; Beppu B-con Plaza; Mishima Citizen Gymnasium; Himi Municipal Sports Center; Higashi-Hiroshima Sports Park	Ota City General Gymnasium; Kusanagi General Gymnasium; Osaka Municipal Central Gymnasium; Kawasaki City Todoroki Arena; Taiyo Yakuhin Ocean Arena; Musashino Forest Sport Plaza

== Season standing procedure ==
1. The teams will be ranked by the most point gained per match as follows:
  - Match won 3–0 or 3–1: 3 points for the winner, 0 points for the loser
  - Match won 3–2: 2 points for the winner, 1 point for the loser
  - Match forfeited: 3 points for the winner, 0 points (0–25, 0–25, 0–25) for the loser
2. In the event of a tie, the following first tiebreaker will apply: Total number of victories (matches won, matched lost)
3. If teams are still tied after examining points gained and the number of victories, then the FIVB will examine the results in order to break the tie in the following order:
  - Set quotient: if two or more teams are tied on total number of victories, they will be ranked by the quotient resulting from the division of the number of all set won by the number of all sets lost.
  - Points quotient: if the tie persists based on the set quotient, the teams will be ranked by the quotient resulting from the division of all points scored by the total of points lost during all sets.
  - If the tie persists based on the point quotient, the tie will be broken based on the team that won the match of the Round Robin Phase between the tied teams. When the tie in point quotient is between three or more teams, these teams ranked taking into consideration only the matches involving the teams in question.

== Regular round ==
=== League table ===
==== Standings ====
Pos	Team	Pld	W	L	Pts	SW	SL	SR	SPW	SPL	SPR	Qualification
1	Panasonic Panthers	27	23	4	68	72	24	3.000	2332	2099	1.111	Final 6
2	Suntory Sunbirds	27	19	8	56	65	40	1.625	2456	2287	1.074	Final 6
3	Toyoda Gosei Trefuerza	27	19	8	53	62	38	1.632	2344	2215	1.058	Final 6
4	JT Thunders	27	17	10	53	62	36	1.722	2294	2067	1.110	Final 6
5	Toray Arrows	27	16	11	49	55	41	1.341	2212	2133	1.037	Final 6
6	Osaka Blazers Sakai	27	15	12	47	57	42	1.357	2226	2211	1.007	Final 6
7	JTEKT Stings	27	13	14	41	52	51	1.020	2347	2311	1.016	
8	FC Tokyo	27	8	19	24	32	63	0.508	2038	2221	0.918	
9	Oita Miyoshi Weisse Adler	27	4	23	11	22	74	0.297	2028	2339	0.867	
10	VC Nagano Tridents	27	1	26	3	8	78	0.103	1737	2131	0.815	

Updated to match(es) played on 24 February 2019. Source: Ranking Table V.league Division 1 Men's 2018–19

==== Positions by round ====
Leader and qualification to Final 6
Qualification to Final 6

Team ╲ Round	Leg 1					Leg 2					Leg 3				
Team ╲ Round	1	2	3	4	5	1	2	3	4	5	1	2	3	4	5
Panasonic Panthers	1	1	1	1	1	1	2	1	1	1	1	1	1	1	1
Toyoda Gosei Trefuerza	2	2	3	6	4	4	3	4	4	4	4	4	4	4	3
Toray Arrows	4	5	5	4	7	6	7	6	6	5	6	7	5	5	5
JT Thunders	7	4	4	3	5	5	4	3	3	3	2	3	3	3	4
Suntory Sunbirds	6	6	2	2	2	2	1	2	2	2	3	2	2	2	2
JTEKT Stings	3	3	6	5	3	3	5	5	5	6	5	5	6	7	7
Osaka Blazers Sakai	8	7	7	7	6	7	6	7	7	7	7	6	7	6	6
FC Tokyo	9	9	8	8	8	8	8	8	8	8	8	8	8	8	8
Oita Miyoshi Weisse Adler	10	10	10	10	10	10	9	9	9	9	9	9	9	9	9
VC Nagano Tridents	5	8	9	9	9	9	10	10	10	10	10	10	10	10	10

==== Results by match played ====
Team ╲ Round	1	2	3	4	5	6	7	8	9	10	11	12	13	14	15	16	17	18	19	20	21	22	23	24	25	26	27
Panasonic Panthers	W	W	W	W	W	W	W	L	W	W	W	L	W	W	W	W	W	W	W	W	W	W	W	L	W	L	W
Toyoda Gosei Trefuerza	W	W	W	L	L	W	L	W	W	W	W	W	L	W	L	W	W	L	L	W	W	W	W	L	W	W	W
Toray Arrows	W	L	L	W	W	L	W	L	L	W	L	L	W	W	W	L	W	W	L	W	L	W	W	W	W	W	L
JT Thunders	L	W	W	W	L	L	W	L	W	L	W	W	L	W	W	W	W	W	W	W	W	L	L	L	L	W	W
Suntory Sunbirds	W	W	L	W	W	W	W	W	W	W	W	W	W	L	L	W	L	W	W	L	L	W	L	W	W	W	L
JTEKT Stings	W	W	L	W	L	L	W	W	W	L	W	L	L	W	W	L	L	L	L	W	L	W	W	L	L	W	L
Osaka Blazers Sakai	L	L	W	L	W	W	L	W	L	L	W	W	W	L	W	L	L	L	W	W	W	W	L	W	L	W	W
FC Tokyo	L	L	L	W	L	W	W	L	L	L	L	L	L	L	L	W	L	W	W	L	L	L	L	W	L	L	W
Oita Miyoshi Weisse Adler	L	L	L	L	L	L	L	L	L	W	L	W	L	L	L	L	W	L	L	L	L	L	W	L	L	L	L
VC Nagano Tridents	L	W	L	L	L	L	L	L	L	L	L	L	L	L	L	L	L	L	L	L	L	L	L	L	L	L	L

W = Win; L = Lose

==== Results table ====
===== Leg 1 =====
Home \ Away	PAN	TOY	TOR	JT	SUN	JTE	OBS	FCT	OIT	VCN
Panasonic Panthers		3–0	3–0	3–0	1–3	3–1	3–1	3–0	3–1	3–0
Toyoda Gosei Trefuerza	0–3		3–1	3–2	1–3	1–3	3–1	3–0	3–0	3–0
Toray Arrows	0–3	1–3		0–3	3–1	0–3	3–1	1–3	3–0	3–0
JT Thunders	0–3	2–3	3–0		2–3	3–0	1–3	3–0	3–0	3–0
Suntory Sunbirds	3–1	3–1	1–3	3–2		3–1	3–1	3–1	3–0	3–0
JTEKT Stings	1–3	3–1	3–0	0–3	1–3		3–1	3–0	3–1	3–0
Osaka Blazers Sakai	1–3	1–3	1–3	3–1	1–3	1–3		3–1	3–1	3–0
FC Tokyo	0–3	0–3	3–1	0–3	1–3	0–3	1–3		3–1	3–0
Oita Miyoshi Weisse Adler	1–3	0–3	0–3	0–3	0–3	1–3	1–3	1–3		0–3
VC Nagano Tridents	0–3	0–3	0–3	0–3	0–3	0–3	0–3	0–3	3–0	

Legend: Blue = home team win; Yellow = draw; Red = away team win.

===== Leg 2 =====
Home \ Away	PAN	TOY	TOR	JT	SUN	JTE	OBS	FCT	OIT	VCN
Panasonic Panthers		3–1	3–1	1–3	3–0	3–1	3–0	3–0	3–1	3–0
Toyoda Gosei Trefuerza	1–3		0–3	1–3	3–1	3–2	3–1	3–0	3–0	3–0
Toray Arrows	1–3	3–0		3–0	3–0	1–3	3–1	3–0	2–3	3–0
JT Thunders	3–1	3–1	0–3		2–3	3–2	3–0	3–1	3–0	3–0
Suntory Sunbirds	0–3	1–3	0–3	3–2		3–1	3–2	3–1	3–0	3–0
JTEKT Stings	1–3	2–3	3–1	2–3	1–3		1–3	3–2	2–3	3–1
Osaka Blazers Sakai	0–3	1–3	1–3	0–3	2–3	3–1		3–0	3–0	3–0
FC Tokyo	0–3	0–3	0–3	1–3	1–3	2–3	0–3		3–2	3–1
Oita Miyoshi Weisse Adler	1–3	0–3	3–2	0–3	0–3	3–2	0–3	2–3		3–1
VC Nagano Tridents	0–3	0–3	0–3	0–3	0–3	1–3	0–3	1–3	1–3	

Legend: Blue = home team win; Yellow = draw; Red = away team win.

===== Leg 3 =====
Home \ Away	PAN	TOY	TOR	JT	SUN	JTE	OBS	FCT	OIT	VCN
Panasonic Panthers		1–3	3–1	3–1	3–2	3–0	0–3	3–0	3–0	3–1
Toyoda Gosei Trefuerza	3–1		1–3	0–3	3–2	3–1	3–2	3–0	3–0	3–0
Toray Arrows	1–3	3–1		3–1	3–1	0–3	0–3	3–0	3–1	3–1
JT Thunders	1–3	3–0	1–3		3–1	3–0	1–3	1–3	3–0	3–0
Suntory Sunbirds	2–3	2–3	1–3	1–3		3–1	3–1	3–1	3–0	3–0
JTEKT Stings	0–3	1–3	3–0	0–3	1–3		0–3	3–1	3–1	3–0
Osaka Blazers Sakai	3–0	2–3	3–0	3–1	1–3	3–0		3–0	3–1	3–0
FC Tokyo	0–3	0–3	0–3	3–1	1–3	1–3	0–3		3–0	3–0
Oita Miyoshi Weisse Adler	0–3	0–3	1–3	0–3	0–3	1–3	1–3	0–3		3–0
VC Nagano Tridents	1–3	0–3	1–3	0–3	0–3	0–3	0–3	0–3	0–3	

Legend: Blue = home team win; Yellow = draw; Red = away team win.

==== Head-to-head results ====
Home \ Away	PAN	TOY	TOR	JT	SUN	JTE	OBS	FCT	OIT	VCN
Panasonic Panthers		2–1	3–0	2–1	2–1	3–0	2–1	3–0	3–0	3–0
Toyoda Gosei Trefuerza	1–2		1–2	1–2	2–1	2–1	3–0	3–0	3–0	3–0
Toray Arrows	0–3	2–1		2–1	3–0	0–3	2–1	2–1	2–1	3–0
JT Thunders	1–2	2–1	1–2		1–2	3–0	1–2	2–1	3–0	3–0
Suntory Sunbirds	1–2	1–2	0–3	2–1		3–0	3–0	3–0	3–0	3–0
JTEKT Stings	0–3	1–2	3–0	0–3	0–3		1–2	3–0	2–1	3–0
Osaka Blazers Sakai	1–2	0–3	1–2	2–1	0–3	2–1		3–0	3–0	3–0
FC Tokyo	0–3	0–3	1–2	1–2	0–3	0–3	0–3		3–0	3–0
Oita Miyoshi Weisse Adler	0–3	0–3	1–2	0–3	0–3	1–2	0–3	0–3		2–1
VC Nagano Tridents	0–3	0–3	0–3	0–3	0–3	0–3	0–3	0–3	1–2	

Legend: Blue = home team win; Yellow = draw; Red = away team win.

=== Leg 1 ===
==== Week 1 ====
===== Stadium =====
Stadium 1	Stadium 2	Stadium 3
Ōta	Matsumoto	Komaki
Ota City General Gymnasium	Matsumoto City Gymnasium	Park Arena Komaki
JT Thunders; Suntory Sunbirds	Toray Arrows; VC Nagano Tridents; Panasonic Panthers; Oita Miyoshi Weisse Adler	FC Tokyo; JTEKT Stings; Osaka Blazers Sakai; Toyoda Gosei Trefuerza

===== Results =====
- All times are Japan Standard Time (UTC+09:00).

Date	Time		Score		Set 1	Set 2	Set 3	Set 4	Set 5	Total	Report
26 Oct	19:30	Suntory Sunbirds	3–2	JT Thunders	25–19	21–25	18–25	25–22	15–12	104–103	Report Stats
27 Oct	12:00	Toray Arrows	3–0	Oita Miyoshi Weisse Adler	25–15	25–20	25–19			75–54	Report Stats
27 Oct	13:00	Toyoda Gosei Trefuerza	3–0	FC Tokyo	25–20	29–27	25–17			79–64	Report Stats
27 Oct	16:00	VC Nagano Tridents	0–3	Panasonic Panthers	19–25	17–25	23–25			59–75	Report Stats
27 Oct	16:00	JTEKT Stings	3–1	Osaka Blazers Sakai	25–19	21–25	25–15	25–21		96–80	Report Stats
28 Oct	12:00	VC Nagano Tridents	3–0	Oita Miyoshi Weisse Adler	25–21	25–23	25–21			75–65	Report Stats
28 Oct	13:00	Toyoda Gosei Trefuerza	3–1	Osaka Blazers Sakai	23–25	25–21	25–21	25–15		98–82	Report Stats
28 Oct	15:00	Panasonic Panthers	3–0	Toray Arrows	25–19	25–17	25–22			75–58	Report Stats
28 Oct	16:30	JTEKT Stings	3–0	FC Tokyo	32–30	25–23	25–18			82–71	Report Stats

==== Week 2 ====
===== Stadium =====
Stadium 1	Stadium 2	Stadium 3
Sakai	Fukui	Hiroshima
Kanaoka Park Gymnasium	Fukui Prefectural Gymnasium	Kure City General Gymnasium
FC Tokyo; Osaka Blazers Sakai	JTEKT Stings; Panasonic Panthers; Toyoda Gosei Trefuerza; Oita Miyoshi Weisse Adler	JT Thunders; Toray Arrows; Suntory Sunbirds; VC Nagano Tridents

===== Results =====
- All times are Japan Standard Time (UTC+09:00).

Date	Time		Score		Set 1	Set 2	Set 3	Set 4	Set 5	Total	Report
3 Nov	12:00	Toyoda Gosei Trefuerza	3–0	Oita Miyoshi Weisse Adler	25–20	25–22	25–20			75–62	Report Stats
3 Nov	13:00	Suntory Sunbirds	3–0	VC Nagano Tridents	25–22	25–16	25–12			75–50	Report Stats
3 Nov	15:00	Panasonic Panthers	3–1	JTEKT Stings	23–25	25–21	25–16	26–24		99–86	Report Stats
3 Nov	16:00	JT Thunders	3–0	Toray Arrows	25–19	25–18	25–17			75–54	Report Stats
3 Nov	16:00	Osaka Blazers Sakai	3–1	FC Tokyo	23–25	25–22	25–21	25–22		98–90	Report Stats
4 Nov	12:00	JTEKT Stings	3–1	Oita Miyoshi Weisse Adler	23–25	25–20	25–19	25–15		98–79	Report Stats
4 Nov	12:00	Toray Arrows	3–1	Suntory Sunbirds	25–23	24–26	25–23	26–24		100–96	Report Stats
4 Nov	15:00	Panasonic Panthers	3–0	Toyoda Gosei Trefuerza	25–21	26–24	25–16			76–61	Report Stats
4 Nov	15:00	JT Thunders	3–0	VC Nagano Tridents	25–21	25–22	25–18			75–61	Report Stats

==== Week 3 ====
===== Stadium =====
Stadium 1	Stadium 2	Stadium 3
Mishima	Sumida	Kariya
Mishima Citizen Gymnasium	Sumida City Gymnasium	Wing Arena Kariya
Toray Arrows; VC Nagano Tridents	FC Tokyo; Panasonic Panthers; Osaka Blazers Sakai; Oita Miyoshi Weisse Adler	JT Thunders; JTEKT Stings; Suntory Sunbirds; Toyoda Gosei Trefuerza

===== Results =====
- All times are Japan Standard Time (UTC+09:00).

Date	Time		Score		Set 1	Set 2	Set 3	Set 4	Set 5	Total	Report
10 Nov	13:00	FC Tokyo	3–1	Oita Miyoshi Weisse Adler	25–21	21–25	25–15	25–17		96–78	Report Stats
10 Nov	13:00	JTEKT Stings	0–3	JT Thunders	21–25	17–25	19–25			57–75	Report Stats
10 Nov	16:00	Panasonic Panthers	3–1	Osaka Blazers Sakai	23–25	25–19	25–21	25–23		98–88	Report Stats
10 Nov	16:00	Toyoda Gosei Trefuerza	1–3	Suntory Sunbirds	22–25	22–25	26–24	22–25		92–99	Report Stats
11 Nov	12:00	Osaka Blazers Sakai	3–1	Oita Miyoshi Weisse Adler	25–21	25–20	23–25	25–21		98–87	Report Stats
11 Nov	12:00	JTEKT Stings	1–3	Suntory Sunbirds	26–24	25–27	15–25	23–25		89–101	Report Stats
11 Nov	13:00	Toray Arrows	3–0	VC Nagano Tridents	25–19	25–21	26–24			76–64	Report Stats
11 Nov	15:00	FC Tokyo	0–3	Panasonic Panthers	19–25	17–25	17–25			53–75	Report Stats
11 Nov	15:00	Toyoda Gosei Trefuerza	3–2	JT Thunders	23–25	22–25	32–30	25–22	15–9	117–111	Report Stats

==== Week 4 ====
===== Stadium =====
Stadium 1	Stadium 2	Stadium 3
Kariya	Osaka	Shizuoka
Wing Arena Kariya	Osaka Municipal Central Gymnasium	Kusanagi General Gymnasium
JTEKT Stings; Toyoda Gosei Trefuerza	JT Thunders; Suntory Sunbirds; Panasonic Panthers; Oita Miyoshi Weisse Adler	FC Tokyo; Toray Arrows; VC Nagano Tridents; Osaka Blazers Sakai

===== Results =====
- All times are Japan Standard Time (UTC+09:00).

Date	Time		Score		Set 1	Set 2	Set 3	Set 4	Set 5	Total	Report
17 Nov	11:00	Panasonic Panthers	3–0	JT Thunders	25–20	25–23	25–22			75–65	Report Stats
17 Nov	13:00	Toray Arrows	1–3	FC Tokyo	25–19	21–25	16–25	21–25		83–94	Report Stats
17 Nov	15:00	Suntory Sunbirds	3–0	Oita Miyoshi Weisse Adler	25–18	25–22	25–19			75–59	Report Stats
17 Nov	16:00	Osaka Blazers Sakai	3–0	VC Nagano Tridents	25–19	25–23	25–19			75–61	Report Stats
17 Nov	18:30	JTEKT Stings	3–1	Toyoda Gosei Trefuerza	25–19	22–25	25–15	25–22		97–81	Report Stats
18 Nov	11:00	JT Thunders	3–0	Oita Miyoshi Weisse Adler	25–17	25–13	25–17			75–47	Report Stats
18 Nov	12:00	Toray Arrows	3–1	Osaka Blazers Sakai	20–25	25–15	25–20	25–18		95–78	Report Stats
18 Nov	15:00	Suntory Sunbirds	3–1	Panasonic Panthers	25–23	25–15	23–25	25–20		98–83	Report Stats
18 Nov	15:00	FC Tokyo	3–0	VC Nagano Tridents	25–14	25–18	25–20			75–52	Report Stats

==== Week 5 ====
===== Stadium =====
Stadium 1	Stadium 2	Stadium 3
Oita	Matsumoto	Sakai
Oita Prefectural General Stadium	Matsumoto City Gymnasium	Kanaoka Park Gymnasium
Panasonic Panthers; Oita Miyoshi Weisse Adler	JTEKT Stings; Toray Arrows; VC Nagano Tridents; Toyoda Gosei Trefuerza	FC Tokyo; JT Thunders; Suntory Sunbirds; Osaka Blazers Sakai

===== Results =====
- All times are Japan Standard Time (UTC+09:00).

Date	Time		Score		Set 1	Set 2	Set 3	Set 4	Set 5	Total	Report
24 Nov	12:00	Toyoda Gosei Trefuerza	3–1	Toray Arrows	21–25	25–22	25–19	25–23		96–89	Report Stats
24 Nov	12:00	Osaka Blazers Sakai	3–1	JT Thunders	25–23	25–23	11–25	25–22		86–93	Report Stats
24 Nov	15:00	Suntory Sunbirds	3–1	FC Tokyo	23–25	25–16	25–14	25–20		98–75	Report Stats
24 Nov	16:00	VC Nagano Tridents	0–3	JTEKT Stings	21–25	21–25	23–25			65–75	Report Stats
25 Nov	12:00	VC Nagano Tridents	0–3	Toyoda Gosei Trefuerza	17–25	19–25	19–25			55–75	Report Stats
25 Nov	12:00	Osaka Blazers Sakai	1–3	Suntory Sunbirds	25–19	21–25	12–25	21–25		79–94	Report Stats
25 Nov	13:00	Oita Miyoshi Weisse Adler	1–3	Panasonic Panthers	22–25	20–25	25–21	22–25		89–96	Report Stats
25 Nov	15:00	JT Thunders	3–0	FC Tokyo	25–17	25–19	25–21			75–57	Report Stats
25 Nov	15:00	Toray Arrows	0–3	JTEKT Stings	19–25	20–25	22–25			61–75	Report Stats

=== Leg 2 ===
==== Week 1 ====
===== Stadium =====
Stadium 1	Stadium 2	Stadium 3
Komaki	Tokyo	Tokushima
Park Arena Komaki	Komazawa Gymnasium	Tokushima Gymnasium
Osaka Blazers Sakai; Toyoda Gosei Trefuerza	FC Tokyo; Suntory Sunbirds; VC Nagano Tridents; Panasonic Panthers	JT Thunders; JTEKT Stings; Toray Arrows; Oita Miyoshi Weisse Adler

===== Results =====
- All times are Japan Standard Time (UTC+09:00).

Date	Time		Score		Set 1	Set 2	Set 3	Set 4	Set 5	Total	Report
1 Dec	13:00	FC Tokyo	1–3	Suntory Sunbirds	17–25	25–18	21–25	22–25		85–93	Report Stats
1 Dec	13:00	JTEKT Stings	2–3	Oita Miyoshi Weisse Adler	20–25	25–23	22–25	25–23	19–21	111–117	Report Stats
1 Dec	16:00	Panasonic Panthers	3–0	VC Nagano Tridents	27–25	25–19	25–18			77–62	Report Stats
1 Dec	16:00	JT Thunders	0–3	Toray Arrows	18–25	19–25	20–25			57–75	Report Stats
2 Dec	12:00	Suntory Sunbirds	3–0	VC Nagano Tridents	25–22	25–23	25–17			75–62	Report Stats
2 Dec	12:00	JTEKT Stings	3–1	Toray Arrows	25–21	19–25	25–21	25–23		94–90	Report Stats
2 Dec	14:00	Toyoda Gosei Trefuerza	3–1	Osaka Blazers Sakai	25–21	20–25	25–20	25–18		95–84	Report Stats
2 Dec	15:00	FC Tokyo	0–3	Panasonic Panthers	25–27	15–25	16–25			56–77	Report Stats
2 Dec	15:00	JT Thunders	3–0	Oita Miyoshi Weisse Adler	25–21	25–17	25–19			75–57	Report Stats

==== Week 2 ====
===== Stadium =====
Stadium 1	Stadium 2	Stadium 3
Oita	Hirakata	Kitakyushu
Oita Prefectural General Stadium	Panasonic Arena	Kitakyushu General Stadium
Toray Arrows; Oita Miyoshi Weisse Adler	JT Thunders; JTEKT Stings; Suntory Sunbirds; Panasonic Panthers	FC Tokyo; VC Nagano Tridents; Osaka Blazers Sakai; Toyoda Gosei Trefuerza

===== Results =====
- All times are Japan Standard Time (UTC+09:00).

Date	Time		Score		Set 1	Set 2	Set 3	Set 4	Set 5	Total	Report
8 Dec	13:00	JTEKT Stings	1–3	Suntory Sunbirds	25–22	15–25	19–25	25–27		84–99	Report Stats
8 Dec	13:02	Osaka Blazers Sakai	3–0	VC Nagano Tridents	25–21	25–22	25–21			75–64	Report Stats
8 Dec	15:00	Panasonic Panthers	1–3	JT Thunders	26–28	25–14	15–25	18–25		84–92	Report Stats
8 Dec	15:00	Toyoda Gosei Trefuerza	3–0	FC Tokyo	25–18	25–22	25–21			75–61	Report Stats
9 Dec	12:00	JT Thunders	2–3	Suntory Sunbirds	25–16	27–29	25–22	23–25	9–15	109–107	Report Stats
9 Dec	12:01	Osaka Blazers Sakai	3–0	FC Tokyo	25–22	25–21	25–20			75–63	Report Stats
9 Dec	13:00	Oita Miyoshi Weisse Adler	3–2	Toray Arrows	25–19	22–25	23–25	25–21	15–12	110–102	Report Stats
9 Dec	15:00	Toyoda Gosei Trefuerza	3–0	VC Nagano Tridents	25–20	25–19	25–23			75–62	Report Stats
9 Dec	15:15	Panasonic Panthers	3–1	JTEKT Stings	18–25	25–20	27–25	25–22		95–92	Report Stats

==== Week 3 ====
===== Stadium =====
Stadium 1	Stadium 2	Stadium 3
Hirakata	Komaki	Hiroshima
Panasonic Arena	Park Arena Komaki	Hiroshima Prefectural Sports Center
Suntory Sunbirds; Panasonic Panthers	Toray Arrows; Osaka Blazers Sakai; Toyoda Gosei Trefuerza; Oita Miyoshi Weisse Adler	FC Tokyo; JT Thunders; JTEKT Stings; VC Nagano Tridents

===== Results =====
- All times are Japan Standard Time (UTC+09:00).

Date	Time		Score		Set 1	Set 2	Set 3	Set 4	Set 5	Total	Report
5 Jan	13:00	Toyoda Gosei Trefuerza	0–3	Toray Arrows	20–25	20–25	23–25			63–75	Report Stats
5 Jan	13:00	JT Thunders	3–1	FC Tokyo	25–18	24–26	26–19	25–23		100–86	Report Stats
5 Jan	14:00	Panasonic Panthers	3–0	Suntory Sunbirds	25–21	25–17	25–23			75–61	Report Stats
5 Jan	16:00	Osaka Blazers Sakai	3–0	Oita Miyoshi Weisse Adler	25–22	25–21	25–17			75–60	Report Stats
5 Jan	16:00	JTEKT Stings	3–1	VC Nagano Tridents	21–25	25–18	25–20	25–23		96–86	Report Stats
6 Jan	12:00	JTEKT Stings	3–2	FC Tokyo	25–14	21–25	25–14	24–26	15–13	110–92	Report Stats
6 Jan	13:00	Toyoda Gosei Trefuerza	3–0	Oita Miyoshi Weisse Adler	25–23	25–20	27–25			77–68	Report Stats
6 Jan	15:00	JT Thunders	3–0	VC Nagano Tridents	25–20	27–25	25–20			77–65	Report Stats
6 Jan	16:00	Toray Arrows	3–1	Osaka Blazers Sakai	25–18	19–25	25–18	25–12		94–73	Report Stats

==== Week 4 ====
===== Stadium =====
Stadium 1	Stadium 2	Stadium 3
Sumida	Oita	Fukuyama
Sumida City Gymnasium	Oita Prefectural General Stadium	Rose Arena Midoricho Indoor Stadium
FC Tokyo; VC Nagano Tridents	Toray Arrows; Suntory Sunbirds; Panasonic Panthers; Oita Miyoshi Weisse Adler	JT Thunders; JTEKT Stings; Osaka Blazers Sakai; Toyoda Gosei Trefuerza

===== Results =====
- All times are Japan Standard Time (UTC+09:00).

Date	Time		Score		Set 1	Set 2	Set 3	Set 4	Set 5	Total	Report
12 Jan	12:00	Toray Arrows	3–0	Suntory Sunbirds	25–23	29–27	25–20			79–70	Report Stats
12 Jan	13:00	JTEKT Stings	1–3	Osaka Blazers Sakai	22–25	25–15	22–25	14–25		83–90	Report Stats
12 Jan	15:00	Oita Miyoshi Weisse Adler	1–3	Panasonic Panthers	40–42	19–25	25–20	21–25		105–112	Report Stats
12 Jan	15:00	FC Tokyo	3–1	VC Nagano Tridents	25–18	17–25	25–23	25–23		92–89	Report Stats
12 Jan	16:00	JT Thunders	3–1	Toyoda Gosei Trefuerza	20–25	25–20	25–21	25–21		95–87	Report Stats
13 Jan	12:00	Panasonic Panthers	3–1	Toray Arrows	19–25	25–17	26–24	25–19		95–85	Report Stats
13 Jan	12:00	Toyoda Gosei Trefuerza	3–2	JTEKT Stings	25–19	25–22	21–25	20–25	15–11	106–102	Report Stats
13 Jan	15:00	JT Thunders	3–0	Osaka Blazers Sakai	25–20	25–20	25–22			75–62	Report Stats
13 Jan	15:00	Oita Miyoshi Weisse Adler	0–3	Suntory Sunbirds	24–26	21–25	29–31			74–82	Report Stats

==== Week 5 ====
===== Stadium =====
Stadium 1	Stadium 2	Stadium 3
Matsue	Okinawa	Shizuoka
Matsue City General Gymnasium	Okinawa City Gymnasium	Kusanagi General Gymnasium
JT Thunders; JTEKT Stings	Suntory Sunbirds; Panasonic Panthers; Osaka Blazers Sakai; Toyoda Gosei Trefuerza	FC Tokyo; Toray Arrows; VC Nagano Tridents; Oita Miyoshi Weisse Adler

===== Results =====
- All times are Japan Standard Time (UTC+09:00).

Date	Time		Score		Set 1	Set 2	Set 3	Set 4	Set 5	Total	Report
19 Jan	12:00	Toyoda Gosei Trefuerza	3–1	Suntory Sunbirds	25–23	37–35	21–25	26–24		109–107	Report Stats
19 Jan	13:00	Toray Arrows	3–0	FC Tokyo	27–25	25–17	25–23			77–65	Report Stats
19 Jan	13:00	JT Thunders	3–2	JTEKT Stings	14–25	22–25	25–22	25–20	15–13	101–105	Report Stats
19 Jan	15:20	Panasonic Panthers	3–0	Osaka Blazers Sakai	25–18	25–20	26–24			76–62	Report Stats
19 Jan	16:00	Oita Miyoshi Weisse Adler	3–1	VC Nagano Tridents	27–25	25–23	24–26	25–20		101–94	Report Stats
20 Jan	12:00	Suntory Sunbirds	3–2	Osaka Blazers Sakai	23–25	25–21	25–19	14–25	15–11	102–101	Report Stats
20 Jan	12:00	Toray Arrows	3–0	VC Nagano Tridents	25–16	25–22	25–14			75–52	Report Stats
20 Jan	15:00	Panasonic Panthers	3–1	Toyoda Gosei Trefuerza	16–25	28–26	26–24	25–17		95–92	Report Stats
20 Jan	15:00	FC Tokyo	3–2	Oita Miyoshi Weisse Adler	23–25	25–20	25–14	21–25	15–13	109–97	Report Stats

=== Leg 3 ===
==== Week 1 ====
===== Stadium =====
Stadium 1	Stadium 2	Stadium 3
Wakayama	Ōta	Matsumoto
Wakayama Prefectural Gymnasium	Ota City General Gymnasium	Matsumoto City Gymnasium
Toray Arrows; Osaka Blazers Sakai	JT Thunders; Suntory Sunbirds; Toyoda Gosei Trefuerza; Oita Miyoshi Weisse Adler	FC Tokyo; JTEKT Stings; VC Nagano Tridents; Panasonic Panthers

===== Results =====
- All times are Japan Standard Time (UTC+09:00).

Date	Time		Score		Set 1	Set 2	Set 3	Set 4	Set 5	Total	Report
26 Jan	11:00	Toyoda Gosei Trefuerza	0–3	JT Thunders	22–25	23–25	13–25			58–75	Report Stats
26 Jan	12:00	Panasonic Panthers	3–0	JTEKT Stings	25–19	25–17	25–22			75–58	Report Stats
26 Jan	12:00	Osaka Blazers Sakai	3–0	Toray Arrows	25–16	25–22	25–18			75–56	Report Stats
26 Jan	15:00	Suntory Sunbirds	3–0	Oita Miyoshi Weisse Adler	25–18	25–17	25–18			75–53	Report Stats
26 Jan	16:00	VC Nagano Tridents	0–3	FC Tokyo	18–25	21–25	17–25			56–75	Report Stats
27 Jan	11:00	JT Thunders	3–0	Oita Miyoshi Weisse Adler	25–18	25–15	25–9			75–42	Report Stats
27 Jan	12:00	VC Nagano Tridents	0–3	JTEKT Stings	23–25	17–25	21–25			61–75	Report Stats
27 Jan	15:00	Suntory Sunbirds	2–3	Toyoda Gosei Trefuerza	25–23	25–21	25–27	22–25	13–15	110–111	Report Stats
27 Jan	15:00	Panasonic Panthers	3–0	FC Tokyo	25–19	25–17	25–21			75–57	Report Stats

==== Week 2 ====
===== Stadium =====
Stadium 1	Stadium 2	Stadium 3
Kariya	Kumamoto	Sakai
Wing Arena Kariya	Kumamoto Prefectural Gymnasium	Kanaoka Park Gymnasium
Toyoda Gosei Trefuerza; Oita Miyoshi Weisse Adler	JT Thunders; Suntory Sunbirds; VC Nagano Tridents; Panasonic Panthers	FC Tokyo; Toray Arrows; JTEKT Stings; Osaka Blazers Sakai

===== Results =====
- All times are Japan Standard Time (UTC+09:00).

Date	Time		Score		Set 1	Set 2	Set 3	Set 4	Set 5	Total	Report
2 Feb	11:00	JT Thunders	3–0	VC Nagano Tridents	25–10	25–14	25–18			75–42	Report Stats
2 Feb	12:00	Osaka Blazers Sakai	3–0	JTEKT Stings	25–18	25–18	25–23			75–59	Report Stats
2 Feb	14:00	Suntory Sunbirds	2–3	Panasonic Panthers	18–25	15–25	25–20	25–22	11–15	94–107	Report Stats
2 Feb	15:00	Toray Arrows	3–0	FC Tokyo	25–20	25–22	25–15			75–57	Report Stats
2 Feb	16:00	Toyoda Gosei Trefuerza	3–0	Oita Miyoshi Weisse Adler	25–18	25–18	25–18			75–54	Report Stats
3 Feb	11:00	Panasonic Panthers	3–1	JT Thunders	20–25	25–22	25–19	27–25		97–91	Report Stats
3 Feb	12:00	Osaka Blazers Sakai	3–0	FC Tokyo	27–25	25–20	25–14			77–59	Report Stats
3 Feb	14:00	Suntory Sunbirds	3–0	VC Nagano Tridents	25–22	25–18	25–19			75–59	Report Stats
3 Feb	15:00	Toray Arrows	0–3	JTEKT Stings	19–25	21–25	21–25			61–75	Report Stats

==== Week 3 ====
===== Stadium =====
Stadium 1	Stadium 2	Stadium 3
Kariya	Beppu	Mishima
Wing Arena Kariya	Beppu B-con Plaza	Mishima Citizen Gymnasium
FC Tokyo; JTEKT Stings	VC Nagano Tridents; Panasonic Panthers; Toyoda Gosei Trefuerza; Oita Miyoshi Weisse Adler	JT Thunders; Toray Arrows; Suntory Sunbirds; Osaka Blazers Sakai

===== Results =====
- All times are Japan Standard Time (UTC+09:00).

Date	Time		Score		Set 1	Set 2	Set 3	Set 4	Set 5	Total	Report
8 Feb	19:00	JTEKT Stings	3–1	FC Tokyo	25–19	28–26	22–25	26–24		101–94	Report Stats
9 Feb	12:00	Toyoda Gosei Trefuerza	3–0	VC Nagano Tridents	25–15	25–20	25–19			75–54	Report Stats
9 Feb	13:00	Toray Arrows	3–1	Suntory Sunbirds	21–25	26–24	25–17	25–22		97–88	Report Stats
9 Feb	15:00	Oita Miyoshi Weisse Adler	0–3	Panasonic Panthers	31–33	28–30	22–25			81–88	Report Stats
9 Feb	16:00	JT Thunders	1–3	Osaka Blazers Sakai	25–19	21–25	25–27	19–25		90–96	Report Stats
10 Feb	12:00	Panasonic Panthers	1–3	Toyoda Gosei Trefuerza	23–25	25–21	21–25	13–25		82–96	Report Stats
10 Feb	12:00	JT Thunders	1–3	Toray Arrows	23–25	25–21	22–25	24–26		94–97	Report Stats
10 Feb	15:00	VC Nagano Tridents	0–3	Oita Miyoshi Weisse Adler	17–25	18–25	19–25			54–75	Report Stats
10 Feb	15:00	Suntory Sunbirds	3–1	Osaka Blazers Sakai	25–23	21–25	25–16	25–13		96–77	Report Stats

==== Week 4 ====
===== Stadium =====
Stadium 1	Stadium 2	Stadium 3
Matsumoto	Ōta	Himi
Matsumoto City Gymnasium	Ota City General Gymnasium	Himi Municipal Fureai Sports Center
VC Nagano Tridents; Panasonic Panthers	FC Tokyo; JT Thunders; JTEKT Stings; Suntory Sunbirds	Toray Arrows; Osaka Blazers Sakai; Toyoda Gosei Trefuerza; Oita Miyoshi Weisse Adler

===== Results =====
- All times are Japan Standard Time (UTC+09:00).

Date	Time		Score		Set 1	Set 2	Set 3	Set 4	Set 5	Total	Report
16 Feb	12:00	Toray Arrows	3–1	Toyoda Gosei Trefuerza	25–27	25–18	25–23	25–23		100–91	Report Stats
16 Feb	13:00	FC Tokyo	3–1	JT Thunders	25–17	25–22	22–25	28–26		100–90	Report Stats
16 Feb	14:00	VC Nagano Tridents	1–3	Panasonic Panthers	17–25	19–25	25–18	29–31		90–99	Report Stats
16 Feb	15:00	Osaka Blazers Sakai	3–1	Oita Miyoshi Weisse Adler	23–25	25–17	27–25	25–21		100–88	Report Stats
16 Feb	16:00	JTEKT Stings	1–3	Suntory Sunbirds	28–30	25–21	25–27	17–25		95–103	Report Stats
17 Feb	12:00	JT Thunders	3–0	JTEKT Stings	25–21	25–22	25–22			75–65	Report Stats
17 Feb	12:00	Toray Arrows	3–1	Oita Miyoshi Weisse Adler	25–19	25–13	21–25	27–25		98–82	Report Stats
17 Feb	15:00	FC Tokyo	1–3	Suntory Sunbirds	16–25	25–20	21–25	16–25		78–95	Report Stats
17 Feb	15:00	Osaka Blazers Sakai	2–3	Toyoda Gosei Trefuerza	23–25	23–25	25–22	25–23	13–15	109–110	Report Stats

==== Week 5 ====
===== Stadium =====
Stadium 1	Stadium 2	Stadium 3
Hiroshima	Hirakata	Kashihara
Higashi-Hiroshima Sports Park	Panasonic Arena	JTEKT Arena Nara
JT Thunders; Suntory Sunbirds	Toray Arrows; VC Nagano Tridents; Panasonic Panthers; Osaka Blazers Sakai	FC Tokyo; JTEKT Stings; Toyoda Gosei Trefuerza; Oita Miyoshi Weisse Adler

===== Results =====
- All times are Japan Standard Time (UTC+09:00).

Date	Time		Score		Set 1	Set 2	Set 3	Set 4	Set 5	Total	Report
23 Feb	12:00	Toray Arrows	3–1	VC Nagano Tridents	25–21	23–25	25–22	25–19		98–87	Report Stats
23 Feb	13:00	JTEKT Stings	3–1	Oita Miyoshi Weisse Adler	25–17	24–26	25–15	25–22		99–80	Report Stats
23 Feb	13:00	JT Thunders	3–1	Suntory Sunbirds	25–19	25–20	27–29	25–16		102–84	Report Stats
23 Feb	15:00	Panasonic Panthers	0–3	Osaka Blazers Sakai	24–26	21–25	28–30			73–81	Report Stats
23 Feb	16:00	FC Tokyo	0–3	Toyoda Gosei Trefuerza	19–25	24–26	16–25			59–76	Report Stats
24 Feb	12:00	VC Nagano Tridents	0–3	Osaka Blazers Sakai	19–25	15–25	22–25			56–75	Report Stats
24 Feb	12:00	JTEKT Stings	1–3	Toyoda Gosei Trefuerza	25–22	25–27	21–25	17–25		88–99	Report Stats
24 Feb	15:00	Toray Arrows	1–3	Panasonic Panthers	21–25	21–25	25–23	20–25		87–98	Report Stats
24 Feb	15:00	FC Tokyo	3–0	Oita Miyoshi Weisse Adler	25–19	25–23	25–22			75–64	Report Stats

== Final stage ==
=== Final 6 ===
==== Standing Procedure ====
1. Total points (win points of final 6 and the ranking points of regular round)
  - Ranking points of regular round; 1st place – 5 point, 2nd place – 4 point, 3rd place – 3 point, 4th place – 2 point, 5th place – 1 point, 6th place – 0 point
2. In the event of a tie, the following first tiebreaker will apply: The ranking points of regular round
3. If teams are still tied after examining total points and the ranking points of regular round, then the FIVB will examine the results in order to break the tie in the following order:
  - The teams will be ranked by the most point gained per match in Final 6 as follows:
    - Match won 3–0 or 3–1: 3 points for the winner, 0 points for the loser
    - Match won 3–2: 2 points for the winner, 1 point for the loser
    - Match forfeited: 3 points for the winner, 0 points (0–25, 0–25, 0–25) for the loser
  - Total number of victories in Final 6 (matches won, matched lost)
  - Set quotient: if two or more teams are tied on total number of victories, they will be ranked by the quotient resulting from the division of the number of all set won by the number of all sets lost.
  - Points quotient: if the tie persists based on the set quotient, the teams will be ranked by the quotient resulting from the division of all points scored by the total of points lost during all sets.
  - If the tie persists based on the point quotient, the tie will be broken based on the team that won the match of the Round Robin Phase between the tied teams. When the tie in point quotient is between three or more teams, these teams ranked taking into consideration only the matches involving the teams in question.

==== Standings ====
Qualified for Final
Qualified for Final 3

		Total Points	Ranking Points	Win Points	Matches		Sets			Points		
Rank	Team	Total Points	Ranking Points	Win Points	W	L	W	L	Ratio	W	L	Ratio
1	Panasonic Panthers	15	5	10	3	2	12	7	1.714	439	409	1.073
2	JT Thunders	13	2	13	4	1	12	8	1.50	453	428	1.03
3	Toray Arrows	12	1	11	4	1	14	9	0.83	511	504	1.01
4	Suntory Sunbirds	10	4	6	2	3	10	12	0.83	490	486	1.01
5	Toyoda Gosei Trefuerza	6	3	3	1	4	7	14	0.50	445	486	0.92
6	Osaka Blazers Sakai	3	0	4	1	4	8	13	0.62	471	486	0.97

==== Results ====
March 9, 2019; 11:00	Panasonic Panthers	3–0	Toyoda Gosei Trefuerza	Kusanagi General Gymnasium, Shizuoka; Attendance: 1,605; Referees: Shin Muranaka, Atsushi Chiyo
March 9, 2019; 11:00	(25–21, 25–19, 25–18); Report Stats			Kusanagi General Gymnasium, Shizuoka; Attendance: 1,605; Referees: Shin Muranaka, Atsushi Chiyo

March 9, 2019; 13:00	Suntory Sunbirds	3–1	Osaka Blazers Sakai	Kusanagi General Gymnasium, Shizuoka; Attendance: 1,580; Referees: Hiroyuki Hara, Yamamoto Sogo
March 9, 2019; 13:00	(25–27, 25–21, 25–19, 25–20); Report Stats			Kusanagi General Gymnasium, Shizuoka; Attendance: 1,580; Referees: Hiroyuki Hara, Yamamoto Sogo

March 9, 2019; 15:00	JT Thunders	3–2	Toray Arrows	Kusanagi General Gymnasium, Shizuoka; Attendance: 2,053; Referees: Masato Ono, Togawa Daisuke
March 9, 2019; 15:00	(25–20, 23–25, 25–17, 18–25, 16–14); Report Stats			Kusanagi General Gymnasium, Shizuoka; Attendance: 2,053; Referees: Masato Ono, Togawa Daisuke

March 10, 2019; 12:00	Panasonic Panthers	3–1	Osaka Blazers Sakai	Kusanagi General Gymnasium, Shizuoka; Attendance: 1,057; Referees: Yamamoto Sogo, Shin Muranaka
March 10, 2019; 12:00	(20–25, 25–21, 25–21, 25–22); Report Stats			Kusanagi General Gymnasium, Shizuoka; Attendance: 1,057; Referees: Yamamoto Sogo, Shin Muranaka

March 10, 2019; 15:00	Suntory Sunbirds	2–3	Toyoda Gosei Trefuerza	Kusanagi General Gymnasium, Shizuoka; Attendance: 1,411; Referees: Atsushi Chiyo, Masato Ono
March 10, 2019; 15:00	(25–22, 25–20, 16–25, 22–25, 18–20); Report Stats			Kusanagi General Gymnasium, Shizuoka; Attendance: 1,411; Referees: Atsushi Chiyo, Masato Ono

March 16, 2019; 11:00	Panasonic Panthers	1–3	Toray Arrows	Osaka Municipal Central Gymnasium, Osaka; Attendance: 1,520; Referees: Tadayoshi Asai, Hirokasu Tomita
March 16, 2019; 11:00	(31–33, 24–26, 25–21, 20–25); Report Stats			Osaka Municipal Central Gymnasium, Osaka; Attendance: 1,520; Referees: Tadayoshi Asai, Hirokasu Tomita

March 16, 2019; 13:00	Suntory Sunbirds	1–3	JT Thunders	Osaka Municipal Central Gymnasium, Osaka; Attendance: 1,860; Referees: Shin Muranaka, Masato Ono
March 16, 2019; 13:00	(25–20, 21–25, 14–25, 29–31); Report Stats			Osaka Municipal Central Gymnasium, Osaka; Attendance: 1,860; Referees: Shin Muranaka, Masato Ono

March 16, 2019; 15:00	Toyoda Gosei Trefuerza	1–3	Osaka Blazers Sakai	Osaka Municipal Central Gymnasium, Osaka; Attendance: 1,200; Referees: Yamamoto Sogo, Yamamoto Kasuyoshi
March 16, 2019; 15:00	(25–23, 18–25, 25–27, 23–25); Report Stats			Osaka Municipal Central Gymnasium, Osaka; Attendance: 1,200; Referees: Yamamoto Sogo, Yamamoto Kasuyoshi

March 17, 2019; 12:00	Panasonic Panthers	3–0	JT Thunders	Osaka Municipal Central Gymnasium, Osaka; Attendance: 1,300; Referees: Masato Ono, Tadayoshi Asai
March 17, 2019; 12:00	(25–18, 25–22, 25–13); Report Stats			Osaka Municipal Central Gymnasium, Osaka; Attendance: 1,300; Referees: Masato Ono, Tadayoshi Asai

March 17, 2019; 15:00	Suntory Sunbirds	1–3	Toray Arrows	Osaka Municipal Central Gymnasium, Osaka; Attendance: 1,600; Referees: Yamamoto Sogo, Shin Muranaka
March 17, 2019; 15:00	(24–26, 20–25, 25–16, 22–25); Report Stats			Osaka Municipal Central Gymnasium, Osaka; Attendance: 1,600; Referees: Yamamoto Sogo, Shin Muranaka

March 23, 2019; 11:00	Toyoda Gosei Trefuerza	2–3	Toray Arrows	Ota City General Gymnasium, Ōta; Attendance: 2,500; Referees: Shin Muranaka, Tadahiro Sawa
March 23, 2019; 11:00	(25–20, 17–25, 25–27, 27–25, 8–15); Report Stats			Ota City General Gymnasium, Ōta; Attendance: 2,500; Referees: Shin Muranaka, Tadahiro Sawa

March 23, 2019; 13:00	JT Thunders	3–1	Osaka Blazers Sakai	Ota City General Gymnasium, Ōta; Attendance: 3,350; Referees: Atsushi Chiyo, Hiroyuki Hara
March 23, 2019; 13:00	(25–20, 23–25, 25–22, 26–24); Report Stats			Ota City General Gymnasium, Ōta; Attendance: 3,350; Referees: Atsushi Chiyo, Hiroyuki Hara

March 23, 2019; 15:00	Panasonic Panthers	2–3	Suntory Sunbirds	Ota City General Gymnasium, Ōta; Attendance: 3,000; Referees: Tadayoshi Asai, Hiroaki Takahashi
March 23, 2019; 15:00	(25–17, 16–25, 25–22, 17–25, 11–15); Report Stats			Ota City General Gymnasium, Ōta; Attendance: 3,000; Referees: Tadayoshi Asai, Hiroaki Takahashi

March 24, 2019; 12:00	Toray Arrows	3-2	Osaka Blazers Sakai	Ota City General Gymnasium, Ōta; Attendance: 1,900
March 24, 2019; 12:00	(25-20, 19-25, 25-23, 17-25, 15-11); Report Stats			Ota City General Gymnasium, Ōta; Attendance: 1,900

March 24, 2019; 15:00	Toyoda Gosei Trefuerza	1-3	JT Thunders	Ota City General Gymnasium, Ōta; Attendance: 2,300
March 24, 2019; 15:00	(20-25, 21-25, 25-18, 16-25); Report Stats			Ota City General Gymnasium, Ōta; Attendance: 2,300

=== Final 3 ===
Team 1	Agg.	Team 2	1st leg	2nd leg
JT Thunders (Japan)	6–3	(Japan) Toray Arrows	3–2	3–1

March 30, 2019; 12:08	JT Thunders	3-2	Toray Arrows	Kawasaki City Todoroki Arena, Kawasaki; Attendance: 880
March 30, 2019; 12:08	(25-21, 25-27, 28-26, 23-25, 15-13); Report Stats			Kawasaki City Todoroki Arena, Kawasaki; Attendance: 880

March 31, 2019; 12:08	JT Thunders	3-1	Toray Arrows	Kawasaki City Todoroki Arena, Kawasaki; Attendance: 1,070
March 31, 2019; 12:08	(25-19, 25-22, 20-25, 28-26); Report Stats			Kawasaki City Todoroki Arena, Kawasaki; Attendance: 1,070

=== Final ===
Final 3				Final
				1	Panasonic Panthers	3
2	JT Thunders	3	3	2	JT Thunders	2
3	Toray Arrows	2	1

Team 1	Agg.	Team 2	1st leg	2nd leg
Panasonic Panthers (Japan)	–	(Japan) JT Thunders	–	–

April 7, 2019; 13:10	Panasonic Panthers	3-2	JT Thunders	Taiyo Yakuhin Ocean Arena, Nagoya; Attendance: 2,035
April 7, 2019; 13:10	(25-22,17-25,23-25,33-31,16-14); Report Stats			Taiyo Yakuhin Ocean Arena, Nagoya; Attendance: 2,035

April 14, 2019; 14:10	Panasonic Panthers	Match 154	Musashino Forest Sport Plaza, Tokyo

== All–Star Game ==
April 21, 2019; 11:00	All–Star Game	Urayasu City Sports Park Gymnasium, Urayasu

== Final standing ==
Rank	Club
1st place, gold medalist(s)	Panasonic Panthers
2nd place, silver medalist(s)	JT Thunders
3rd place, bronze medalist(s)	Toray Arrows
4	Suntory Sunbirds
5	Toyoda Gosei Trefuerza
6	Osaka Blazers Sakai
7	JTEKT Stings
8	FC Tokyo
9	Oita Miyoshi Weisse Adler
10	VC Nagano Tridents

Qualified for the 2020 Asian Men's Club Volleyball Championship

2018–19 V.League Division 1 Men's Champions
Roster: Kunihiro Shimizu, Hideomi Fukatsu, Shinya Yamazoe, Issei Otake, Sogo Watanabe, Kenji Shirasawa, Tsubasa Hisahara, Takahiko Imamura, Akihiro Yamauchi, Masayuki Ikeda, Kazuya Senda, Michal Kubiak, Tatsuya Fukuzawa, Ryouhei Iga, Takeshi Nagano, Chen Chien-Chen, Takahiro Shin, Yasunari Kodama, Yuichiro Komiya

Head coach: Shinji Kawamura

== Awards ==
- Most valuable player
  (Poland) Michał Kubiak
- Winner Head Coach
  (Japan) Shinji Kawamura
- Top Scorer
  (Russia) Dmitry Muserskiy
- Best spiker
  (Russia) Dmitry Muserskiy
- Best blocker
  (Japan) Kenji Shirasawa
- Best server
  (Japan) Yuji Nishida
- Best Serve Receiver
  (Japan) Koichiro Koga
- Best receiver
  (Japan) Takeshi Nagano
- Best libero
  (Japan) Koichiro Koga
- Best New Player
  (Japan) Issei Otake
  (Japan) Yuji Nishida
- Best 6
  (Poland) Michał Kubiak
  (Australia) Thomas Edgar
  (Russia) Dmitry Muserskiy
  (Japan) Kenji Shirasawa
  (Japan) Taishi Onodera
  (Japan) Hideomi Fukatsu

== Statistics leaders ==
=== Regular round ===
==== Individual ====
The statistics of each group follows the vis reports. The statistics include 4 volleyball skills; serve, reception, spike, and block. The table below shows the top 10 ranked players in each skill plus top scorers at the completion of the tournament.

As of matches played on 24 February 2019.

Best Scorers
	Player	Club	Spikes	Blocks	Serves	Total
1	(Russia) Dmitry Muserskiy	Suntory Sunbirds	660	41	35	736
2	(Australia) Thomas Edgar	JT Thunders	562	45	14	621
3	(Japan) Yūji Nishida	JTEKT Stings	475	50	45	570
4	(Rwanda) Yakan Guma	Oita Miyoshi Weisse Adler	467	13	9	489
5	(France) Antonin Rouzier	Toray Arrows	385	37	24	446
6	(North Macedonia) Nikola Gjorgiev	Osaka Blazers Sakai	407	16	19	442
7	(Bulgaria) Valentin Bratoev	JTEKT Stings	328	35	41	404
8	(Poland) Michał Kubiak	Panasonic Panthers	329	40	29	398
9	(Canada) Jason DeRocco	FC Tokyo	340	39	15	394
10	(Myanmar) Aung Thu	Toray Arrows	337	29	22	388

Best Spikers
	Player	Club	Spikes	Faults	Shots	Total	%
1	(Russia) Dmitry Muserskiy	Suntory Sunbirds	660	83	353	1096	60.22
2	(Japan) Taishi Onodera	JT Thunders	178	12	108	298	59.73
3	(Japan) Hideyuki Kuriyama	FC Tokyo	159	22	104	285	55.79
4	(Australia) Thomas Edgar	JT Thunders	562	77	369	1008	55.75
5	(Poland) Michał Kubiak	Panasonic Panthers	329	35	249	613	53.67
6	(China) Liu Libin	JT Thunders	280	32	213	525	53.33
7	(Myanmar) Aung Thu	Toray Arrows	337	56	248	641	52.57
8	(Japan) Masashi Kuriyama	Suntory Sunbirds	255	27	218	500	51.00
9	(Japan) Yūji Nishida	JTEKT Stings	475	71	391	937	50.69
10	(Japan) Naoya Takano	Osaka Blazers Sakai	273	38	231	542	50.37

Best Blockers
	Player	Club	Matches	Sets	Blocks	Avg.
1	(Japan) Kenji Shirasawa	Panasonic Panthers	25	74	58	0.784
2	(Japan) Taishi Onodera	JT Thunders	27	98	75	0.765
3	(Japan) Ryota Denda	Toyoda Gosei Trefuerza	27	100	58	0.580
4	(China) Liu Libin	JT Thunders	25	85	49	0.577
5	(Japan) Yūji Nishida	JTEKT Stings	27	97	50	0.516
6	(Japan) Takashi Dekita	Osaka Blazers Sakai	25	92	45	0.489
7	(Poland) Michał Kubiak	Panasonic Panthers	26	83	40	0.482
8	(Japan) Akitomo Kanamaru	JTEKT Stings	26	73	35	0.480
9	(Japan) Kentaro Hoshiya	Suntory Sunbirds	26	94	44	0.468
10	(France) Antonin Rouzier	Toray Arrows	23	80	37	0.463

Best Servers
	Player	Club	Aces	Faults	Hits	Total	Eff.
1	(Japan) Yūji Nishida	JTEKT Stings	45	121	233	399	12.22
2	(Poland) Michał Kubiak	Panasonic Panthers	29	66	245	340	11.91
3	(Russia) Dmitry Muserskiy	Suntory Sunbirds	35	105	253	393	11.90
4	(Japan) Yuji Suzuki	Toray Arrows	16	41	159	216	11.46
5	(Bulgaria) Valentin Bratoev	JTEKT Stings	41	100	231	372	11.22
6	(Japan) Tsubasa Hisahara	Panasonic Panthers	15	22	186	223	10.87
7	(France) Antonin Rouzier	Toray Arrows	24	73	179	276	9.60
8	(Myanmar) Aung Thu	Toray Arrows	22	61	264	347	9.01
9	(Japan) Issei Maeda	Toyoda Gosei Trefuerza	10	7	294	311	8.60
10	(North Macedonia) Nikola Gjorgiev	Osaka Blazers Sakai	19	58	211	288	8.59

Best Receivers
	Player	Club	Excellents	Good	Faults	Total	%
1	(Japan) Koichiro Koga	Toyoda Gosei Trefuerza	255	116	79	450	69.56
2	(Japan) Satoshi Ide	Toray Arrows	160	60	59	279	68.10
3	(Japan) Ryo Kohrogi	JTEKT Stings	236	107	110	453	63.91
4	(Japan) Taiki Tsuruda	Suntory Sunbirds	237	104	112	453	63.80
5	(Japan) Wataru Inoue	JT Thunders	194	85	94	373	63.41
6	(Japan) Takeshi Nagano	Panasonic Panthers	205	89	114	408	61.15
7	(Japan) Kenya Fujinaka	Suntory Sunbirds	365	166	207	738	60.71
8	(Myanmar) Aung Thu	Toray Arrows	361	154	211	726	60.33
9	(Philippines) Marck Jesus Espejo	Oita Miyoshi Weisse Adler	364	207	214	785	59.55
10	(Japan) Shohei Yamamoto	JT Thunders	276	165	184	625	57.36

== Attendances ==
=== Overall statistical table ===
As of matches played on 10 February 2019.

Pos	Venue	Total	High	Low	Average
1	Matsumoto City Gymnasium	18570	2260	940	1548
2	Park Arena Komaki	15570	2300	1300	1730
3	Kanaoka Park Gymnasium	12927	1911	942	1436
4	Panasonic Arena	12800	2950	2250	2560
5	Wing Arena Kariya	12000	2400	1000	1714
6	Hiroshima Prefectural Sports Center	11160	4460	1350	2790
7	Ota City General Gymnasium	9108	2453	1070	1822
8	Sumida City Gymnasium	8050	1850	1300	1638
9	Mishima Citizen Gymnasium	7682	1775	1309	1377
10	Rose Arena Midoricho Indoor Stadium	7620	2340	1500	1905
11	Kumamoto Prefectural Gymnasium	7483	2300	1205	1871
12	Oita Prefectural General Stadium	7167	1870	853	1195
13	Kitakyushu General Stadium	6781	2497	1100	1695
14	Kusanagi General Gymnasium	6710	1540	350	839
15	Okinawa City Gymnasium	6519	1957	1366	1630
16	Tokushima Gymnasium	6501	1735	1511	1625
17	Komazawa Gymnasium	5780	2000	1100	1445
18	Kure City General Gymnasium	5300	1600	1000	1325
19	Osaka Municipal Central Gymnasium	5230	2030	550	1308
20	Fukui Prefectural Gymnasium	5200	1600	1000	1300
21	Beppu B-con Plaza	4269	1372	711	1067
22	Wakayama Prefectural Gymnasium	1748	–	–	1748
23	Matsue City General Gymnasium	1600	–	–	1600
Total		185775	4460	350	1587.8

== See also ==
- 2018–19 V.League Division 1 Women's
