= Liu Libin =

Chinese volleyball player (born 1995)

Personal information
- Full name: 刘力宾
- Nationality: Chinese
- Born: 16 February 1995 (age 31); Beijing, China
- Hometown: Beijing, China
- Height: 197 cm (6 ft 6 in)
- Weight: 90 kg (198 lb)
- Spike: 350 cm (138 in)
- Block: 342 cm (135 in)

Volleyball information
- Position: Outside hitter
- Current club: Beijing BAIC Motor
- Number: 16 (Club); 17 (National Team)

Career
Years	Teams
2012–2013 / 2016–2017 / 2020–2021	(China) Beijing BAIC Motor
2017 – 2018	(France) Tourcoing
2018 – 2019	(Japan) JT Thunders

National team
2015; 2015; 2016 – present	China U21; China U23; China
Honours
Men's volleyball
Representing China
U21 World Championship
Bronze medal – third place	2015 Mexico
Asian Cup
Silver medal – second place	2016 Nakhon Pathom
- Last updated: 17 August 2022

Liu Libin (Chinese: 刘力宾; pinyin: liú lì bīn; born February 16, 1995, in Beijing) is a male Chinese volleyball player. He is the first volleyballer who joined a foreign club as a current player of China men's national volleyball team. He currently plays in Beijing BAIC Motor.

== Career ==
=== Club career ===
In 2013, Liu Libin got the champion of the junior event of volleyball in 2013 National Games of China with Jiang Chuan and Zhang Binglong as the main three wing spikers. In 2013–2014 Chinese Volleyball League, he made his debut and got the first champion of the senior event. After several seasons, he became the main OH of Beijing Baic Motor.

In order to improve himself, he decided to join a foreign club and chose Tourcoing Lille Métropole Volley-Ball in 2017. Although he was always the substitute OH of Ukrainian OH, Oleksiy Klyamar, he also helped the club much.

In 2018, Liu joined JT Thunders in 2018–19 V.League Division 1 Men's as the foreign player of AVC with his former clubmate, Thomas Edgar in Season 15/16 in Beijing Baic Motor. He was the main OH because he was good at the spike at Site 6, the block of the Euroamercian OP and the better serve.

=== International career ===
As a young player, Liu Libin participated in 2015 Asian Men's U23 Volleyball Championship as his earliest International tournament. Later, due to injured Zhu Zhiyuan, Liu Libin participated in 2015 FIVB Volleyball Men's U21 World Championship as the main OH and got the third place beyond the expectations of the Chinese U21 men's volleyball team. His International debut of the senior event is 2016 AVC Cup. Jiang Chuan and he played perfect and both got the best. Although he injured for many times, he just took part in 2017 FIVB Volleyball World League, 2018 FIVB Volleyball Men's Nations League and 2018 FIVB Volleyball Men's World Championship.

== Awards ==
=== Individual ===
- 2016 Asian Men's Volleyball Cup "Best outside spiker"

=== Clubs ===
- 2013 National Games of China - Champion, with Beijing Junior
- 2013–2014 Chinese Volleyball League - Champion, with Beijing
- 2014–2015 Chinese Volleyball League - Bronze medal, with Beijing
- 2015–2016 Chinese Volleyball League - Runner-Up, with Beijing
- 2016–2017 Chinese Volleyball League - Runner-Up, with Beijing
- 2017 National Games of China - Runner-Up, with Beijing
- 2017–2018 French Cup - Champion, with Tourcoing
- 2018 Emperor's Cup - Champion, with JT Thunders
- 2018–19 V.League Division 1 - Runner-Up, with JT Thunders

== See also ==
- Profile in 2017 World League
- Profile in French Volleyball League 2017-2018
- Profile in Japanese Volleyball League 2018-2019
