= Peace Cup (volleyball) =

- Sport: Volleyball
- Founded: 1989
- Folded: 1998
- No. of teams: Various
- Continent: Asia and Oceania
- Last champion: (Saudi Arabia) Al Hilal (1st title)
- Most titles: 10 Clubs (1 title each)

The Peace Cup was an annual club volleyball competition between Asian Men's volleyball clubs. The competition was first contested in 1989 in Japan. This competition dissolved in 1998 after the inception of the official Asian Men's Club Volleyball Championship that organised by the Asian Volleyball Confederation (AVC).

These competitions were held from 1989 to 1994 in Hiroshima (6 times). These competitions were held in 1995 and 1996 under the title of the Peace Cup in Tehran and the ninth and tenth edition held in 1997 and 1998, respectively, in Lebanon, to be the last two editions.

When the Asian Volleyball Confederation announced in 1999 to the establishment of a championship for Asian men's and women's clubs to play for the first time under his supervision, the men's clubs interested to participate in the official Asian Men's Club Volleyball Championship instead of the Peace Cup which dissolved after that.

== Championships ==
Edition	Season	Hosts	Champions	Runners-up	Third place	Fourth place	Ref
1	1989	Japan	(Japan) Shin Nihon Steel	(South Korea) Coryo Securities	(China) Bayi	(Japan) JT	
2	1990	Japan	(Japan) JT	(South Korea) Coryo Securities	(China) Hubei	(Japan) Shin Nihon Steel	
3	1991	Japan	(China) Shanghai	(Japan) JT	(South Korea) Korean Air Lines	(Japan) Shin Nihon Steel	
4	1992	Japan	(South Korea) Sangmu	(Japan) NEC	(Japan) JT	(China) Sichuan	
5	1993	Japan	(Kazakhstan) Azamat	(Japan) Fujifilm	(Japan) JT	(South Korea) Coryo Securities	
6	1994	Japan	(Japan) Fujifilm	(Japan) NEC	(South Korea) Hyundai Motor Service	(Japan) JT	
7	1995	Iran	(Japan) Suntory Sunbirds	(Iran) Fath Tehran	(Iran) Foolad Khuzestan	(Kuwait) Kazma	
8	1996	Iran	(Japan) NEC	(Iran) Paykan Tehran	(Iran) Abgineh Qazvin	(China) Sichuan	
9	1997	Lebanon	(South Korea) Samsung Fire & Marine Insurance	(Saudi Arabia) Al Hilal	(Iran) Paykan Tehran	(Japan) Shin Nihon Steel	
10	1998	Lebanon	(Saudi Arabia) Al Hilal	(Iran) Paykan Tehran	(Lebanon) Bosharia	(Kazakhstan) CSKA	

== Performances by club ==
Club	Titles	Runners-up	Third place	Years won	Years runners-up	Years third place
(Japan) NEC Blue Rockets	1	2	0	1996	1992, 1994	—
(Japan) JT Thunders	1	1	2	1990	1991	1992, 1993
(Japan) Fujifilm	1	1	0	1994	1993	—
(Saudi Arabia) Al Hilal	1	1	0	1998	1997	—
(Japan) Osaka Blazers Sakai	1	0	0	1989	—	—
(China) Shanghai	1	0	0	1991	—	—
(South Korea) Sangmu	1	0	0	1992	—	—
(Kazakhstan) Azamat	1	0	0	1993	—	—
(Japan) Suntory Sunbirds	1	0	0	1995	—	—
(Japan) Samsung Fire & Marine Insurance	1	0	0	1997	—	—
(South Korea) Coryo Securities	0	2	0	—	1989, 1990	—
(Iran) Paykan Tehran	0	2	1	—	1996, 1998	1997
(Iran) Fath Tehran	0	1	0	—	1995	—
(China) Bayi	0	0	1	—	—	1989
(China) Hubei	0	0	1	—	—	1990
(South Korea) Korean Air Lines	0	0	1	—	—	1991
(South Korea) Hyundai Motor Service	0	0	1	—	—	1994
(Iran) Foolad Khuzestan	0	0	1	—	—	1995
(Iran) Abgineh Qazvin	0	0	1	—	—	1996
(Lebanon) Bosharia	0	0	1	—	—	1998

== Performances by country ==
Country	Titles	Runners-up	Third place	Years won	Years runners-up	Years Third place
Japan	5	4	2	1989, 1990, 1994, 1995, 1996	1991, 1992, 1993, 1994	1992, 1993
South Korea	2	2	2	1992, 1997	1989, 1990	1991, 1994
Saudi Arabia	1	1	0	1998	1997	—
China	1	0	2	1991	—	1989, 1990
Kazakhstan	1	0	0	1993	—	—
Iran	0	3	3	—	1995, 1996, 1998	1995, 1996, 1997
Lebanon	0	0	1	—	—	1998

== Medals ==
As of 1998 Peace Cup.

Rank	Nation	Gold	Silver	Bronze	Total
1	Japan (JAP)	5	4	2	11
2	South Korea (KOR)	2	2	2	6
3	Saudi Arabia (KSA)	1	1	0	2
4	China (CHN)	1	0	2	3
5	Kazakhstan (KAZ)	1	0	0	1
6	Iran (IRN)	0	3	3	6
7	Lebanon (LBN)	0	0	1	1
Totals (7 entries)		10	10	10	30

== Sources ==
- Asian Volleyball Confederation
- (in Persian) Results
