= Kim Yo-han (volleyball) =

South Korean volleyball player (born 1985)

Personal information
- Nationality: South Korean
- Born: 16 August 1985 (age 41); Gwangju, South Korea
- Height: 2.00 m (6 ft 7 in)
- Weight: 95 kg (209 lb)
- Spike: 335 cm (132 in)
- Block: 326 cm (128 in)
- Education: Inha University

Volleyball information
- Position: Middle blocker

Career
Years	Teams
2007–2017; 2017–2019	LIG Greaters; Ansan OK Savings Bank

National team
2006–2012	South Korea
Honours
Asian Games
Gold medal – first place	2006 Doha
Bronze medal – third place	2010 Guangzhou
Asian Championship
Bronze medal – third place	2009 Manila
Bronze medal – third place	2011 Tehran
AVC Cup
Silver medal – second place	2008 Nakhon Ratchasima

Kim Yo-han (Korean: 김요한; born 16 August 1985, Gwangju) is a South Korean professional volleyball player.

== Career ==
=== Clubs ===
Kim was selected first overall by the LIG Greaters in the 2007 V-League Draft, and subsequently became the starting outside hitter for the team in his rookie season.

After having a mediocre rookie season that has been described as mediocre, Kim broke out in the 2008–09 season when he ranked fourth in total points with 513. The following season, he racked up a team-leading 530 total points, ranked fourth in the league.

In the 2010–11 season, he was sidelined with ankle ligament injury. He came back from the injury prior to the 2010-11 postseason but struggled throughout the postseason, scoring only 20 points in three semi-playoff games.

In the 2011–12 season, Kim converted his position to opposite spiker to fill a void at opposite spiker after an injury to Milan Pepic. As an opposite spiker, Kim had another breakout season, scoring a career-high 671 points.

Prior to the 2012-13 V-League season, Kim helped the Greaters win their first KOVO Cup, scoring over 20 points every game during the tourney, and eventually earned MVP honors. The Greaters, however, finished the 2012-13 regular season in fifth place, failing to reach the postseason.

Kim was named the Greaters' captain in 2012. However, his team and individual performance deteriorated during his captaincy reign. From 2012 to 2017 the Greaters missed the playoffs and Kim's offensive stats declined gradually, plagued by ankle and waist problems.

After the 2016–17 season, Kim was traded to OK Savings Bank Rush & Cash, and converted his position to middle blocker due to his chronic waist injuries.

=== National team ===
While attending Inha University in 2005, Kim got called up to the South Korean national under-21 team for the 2005 World Junior Championship, where South Korea finished in sixth place.

As a junior at Inha University in 2006 Kim first joined the South Korean senior national team to compete in the 2006 Asian Games, where South Korea won gold.

== Individual awards ==
=== Club ===
- 2012 KOVO Cup - Most Valuable Player

=== National team ===
- 2009 Asian Championship - Best Spiker, Best Server
- 2011 Asian Championship - Best Server

== Filmography ==
=== Variety shows ===
Year	Title	Notes
2020	Law of the Jungle in Palawan	Cast Member (Ep. 411–415)
2019 – 2021	Let’s Play Soccer	Cast Member
2021	Playing Bro	Cast Member
2021	Leader's Romance	Cast Member
2021–present	Let’s Play Soccer 2	Cast Member
