= Tsubasa Hisahara =

Japanese male volleyball player (born 1995)

Personal information
- Nationality: Japanese
- Born: 18 March 1995 (age 31) Hyogo, Japan
- Education: Tokai University
- Height: 1.90 m (6 ft 3 in)
- Weight: 80 kg (180 lb)
- Spike: 339 cm (133 in)
- Block: 320 cm (130 in)

Coaching information
- Current team: (Japan) Women's national team
- Previous teams coached
- Years: Teams
- 2022–present: Japan women's team

Volleyball information
- Position: Outside hitter
- Current club: (Japan) Panasonic Panthers
- Number: 7 (club)

Career
- Years: Team
- 2013–2017: (Japan) Tokai University
- 2017–2022: (Japan) Panasonic Panthers

National team
- Years: Team
- 2012–2013: Japan U-19 national team
- 2013: Japan U-21 national team
- 2015: Japan U-23 national team
- 2017: Japan universiade national team
- 2016–2020: Japan senior national team
Medal record
Men's volleyball
Representing Japan
Asian Cup
Bronze medal – third place	2016 Nakhon Pathom	Team
Asian Youth Championship
Bronze medal – third place	2012 Tehran	Team
Eastern Asian Championship
Gold medal – first place	2017 Ulaanbaatar	Team
Summer Universiade
Bronze medal – third place	2017 Taipei	Team

Tsubasa Hisahara (久原 翼 or ひさはら つばさ, Hisahara Tsubasa; born 18 March 1995) is a male Japanese former Volleyball player who played for Panasonic Panthers in V.League Division 1. He used to be the captain of Japanese youth national team and was a part of Japan men's national volleyball team.

== Personal life ==
Hisahara has two older brothers, the one is Daiki Hisahara, and his father was an elementary school Volleyball coach. So, he started playing Volleyball influenced by his family.

== Career ==
He was attended to the Jokoji Volleyball Sports Boy Scouts, where his father was a coach.

When he entered Amagasaki Municipal High School, his physical growth expanded his range of play, and he was selected as a representative under-category and gradually gained confidence. He frequently participated in the All Japan High School Volleyball Championship (Spring High) and the National High School Comprehensive Athletic Meet (Inter-High). He was captain for the third year.

After that, he entered Tokai University, he participated in the game from the first year and led the team with fellow Kentaro Matsubayashi and Wataru Inoue. In the third year, the team won the Emperor's Cup and Empress' Cup All Japan Volleyball Championship title after beating JTEKT Stings, who were in Japanese highest league, with a set count of 3–1. In 2016, when he was in his fourth year, he was first elected to Japan senior national team and was also the captain of the college's volleyball club. At the end of the same year, he became an informal player of the Panasonic Panthers.

In the 2016–17 V.Premier League, he was registered as an informal player. On January 7, 2017, his V.League first appearance was in the game against Toyota Synthetic Trefelsa (currently is Wolf Dogs Nagoya). In the following 2017–18 season, he often participated in games while being a rookie.

In 2017, he was elected to represent Japan at the 29th Universiade Tournament and contributed to the team's bronze medal.

In the 2018–19 season, Tatsuya Fukuzawa, who has the same position with Hisahara, was withdrawn in the middle of the season, and from there he got many opportunities to play in the league. He became a starting member in the final game of the season, the team won the championship and achieved the second consecutive league title. He also participated in the 2019 Asian Men's Club Volleyball Championship as a main player.

In the 2019–20 season, he made a leap forward in the Japan national team and also participated in the 2019 FIVB Volleyball Men's World Cup. For V.League in the same season, Fukuzawa moved to Paris Volley in France, so it made him became a regular player from the beginning of the league. Then, he converted to a professional player from June 1, 2020.

In the latter half of March 2021, he had an ill at the end of 2020–21 V.League 1 and missed the game after March 21. He also missed the semi–finals and final matches and was also excluded from the 2021 Japan national team roster.

He came back in the game competing with FC Tokyo on March 26, 2022, which Panthers won over the opponent. Later on April 19, there was announced that Hisahara would retire from an active player and was assigned to be the Japanese women's national team's assistant coach. By the way, he still being the Panthers' member for the support.

== International tournaments ==
=== National team ===
- Japan men's national under-19 volleyball team (2012–2013)
  - 2012 Asian Youth Boys Volleyball Championship
  - 2013 FIVB Volleyball Boys' U19 World Championship
- Japan men's national under-21 volleyball team (2013)
  - 2013 FIVB Volleyball Men's U21 World Championship
- Japan men's national under-20 volleyball team (2014)
  - 2014 Asian Men's U20 Volleyball Championship
- Japan men's national under-23 volleyball team (2015)
  - 2015 Asian Men's U23 Volleyball Championship
- 2016 Asian Men's Volleyball Cup
- 2017 Eastern Asian Men's Volleyball Championship
- Japan universiade national team (2017)
  - 2017 Summer Universiade
- Japan men's national volleyball team (2014, 2016–2020)
  - 2014 Asian Men's Volleyball Cup (2014)
  - 2019 FIVB Volleyball Men's Nations League
  - 2019 FIVB Volleyball Men's World Cup

=== Club team ===
- 2019 Asian Men's Club Volleyball Championship

== Awards ==
=== Club team ===
- 2017–18 V.Premier League — Champion, with Panasonic Panthers
- 2018–19 V.League 1 — Champion, with Panasonic Panthers
- 2019–20 V.League 1 — Runners-up, with Panasonic Panthers
- 2019 Asian Men's Club Volleyball Championship — Runners-up, with Panasonic Panthers

== See also ==
- バレーボール日本代表の久原翼、プロ契約を機に食意識もプロ級に at athleterecipe.com
- 半生の出来事を視覚化し、モチベーション低下を克服。バレーボール選手としての使命を再確認したコーチング at highflyers.nu
