= Nekoda Memorial Gymnasium =

Gymnasium in Hiroshima, Japan

Coordinates: 34°22′30″N 132°27′47″E

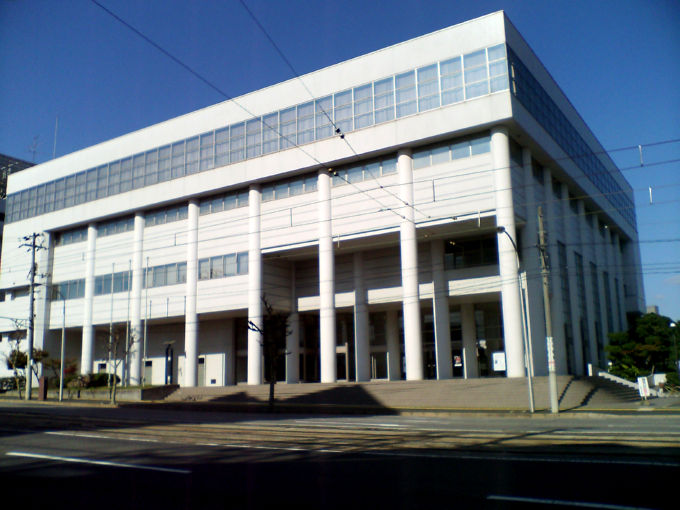
Nekoda Memorial Gymnasium

Nekoda Memorial Gymnasium (猫田記念体育館, Nekoda Kinen Taiikukan) is a gymnasium located in Hiroshima, in southwestern Japan.

== Overview ==
The gymnasium was built in 1989, in memory of Katsutoshi Nekoda, the volleyball setter. It is the home gymnasium of the JT Thunders, a men's volleyball team in Hiroshima.
