= JT Thunders =

Japanese volleyball club

Hiroshima Thunders
- Founded: 1931
- Ground: Nekota Kinen Taiikukan; Hiroshima city, Hiroshima, Japan
- Head Coach: (Argentina) Javier Weber
- Captain: (Japan) Yudai Arai
- League: SV.League
- 2025–26: 5th place
- Website: Club home page

Hiroshima Thunders (広島サンダーズ, Hiroshima Sandāzu) is a men's volleyball team based in Hiroshima city, Hiroshima, Japan. It plays in SV.League. The owner of the club is Japan Tobacco.

== History ==
The club was founded in 1931 as a club of the Ministry of Finance Japan Hiroshima Monopoly Bureau.

In 1985, the team was renamed as Japan Tabaco and changed into JT as in 1989. In 2019, team name changed into JT Thunders Hiroshima.

== Honours ==
Japan Volleyball League/V.League/V.Premier League

- Champion (×1): 2014–15
- Runners-up (×8): 1973, 1978, 1996–97, 2000–01, 2002–03, 2003–04, 2013–14 and 2018–19

Kurowashiki All Japan Volleyball Tournament

- Champions (×2): 2001 and 2004
- Runners-up (×5): 1969, 1977, 1978, 2010 and 2014

Emperor's Cup

- Champion (×3): 2007, 2015, 2018
- Runner-up (×1): 2009

== Current roster ==
The following is the team roster of the 2026/27 season.

No.	Name	Date of birth	Height	Position
1	(Japan) Yuri Yanakita	September 20, 2002 (age 24)	1.92 m (6 ft 4 in)	Outside Hitter
2	(Japan) Yuki Higuchi	April 27, 1996 (age 30)	1.92 m (6 ft 4 in)	Middle Blocker
3	(Japan) Makoto Nishimura	October 7, 1998 (age 28)	1.76 m (5 ft 9 in)	Libero
4	(Japan) Hiromasa Miwa	December 17, 1999 (age 26)	1.92 m (6 ft 4 in)	Middle Blocker
5	(Iran) Mobin Nasri Mastanabad	January 7, 2003 (age 23)	2.02 m (6 ft 8 in)	Outside Hitter
7	(Japan) Yudai Arai (c)	June 27, 1998 (age 28)	1.88 m (6 ft 2 in)	Outside Hitter
9	(Japan) Kaiki Takanashi	October 11, 2002 (age 24)	1.92 m (6 ft 4 in)	Middle Blocker
10	(Japan) Keishiro Takaki	September 3, 2001 (age 25)	1.72 m (5 ft 8 in)	Libero
11	(Japan) Junya Sakashita	June 14, 1998 (age 28)	1.81 m (5 ft 11 in)	Outside Hitter
15	(Japan) Keigo Nishimoto	October 27, 1998 (age 28)	1.89 m (6 ft 2 in)	Middle Blocker
16	(Japan) Chihiro Nishi	November 8, 1997 (age 29)	1.92 m (6 ft 4 in)	Middle Blocker
17	(Japan) Masaki Kaneko	October 23, 1997 (age 29)	1.90 m (6 ft 3 in)	Setter
18	(Japan) Shohei Yamamoto	March 21, 1991 (age 35)	1.87 m (6 ft 2 in)	Outside Hitter
20	(Japan) Daiki Abe	February 16, 2000 (age 26)	1.81 m (5 ft 11 in)	Setter
21	(Japan) Motoki Eiro	June 8, 1996 (age 30)	1.92 m (6 ft 4 in)	Setter
22	(Japan) Hayato Yamamoto	September 29, 2003 (age 23)	1.92 m (6 ft 4 in)	Outside Hitter
23	(Cuba) Daniel Martinez Campos	September 10, 2005 (age 21)	2.10 m (6 ft 11 in)	Opposite
80	(Iran) Amin Esmaeilnezhad	December 17, 1996 (age 29)	2.03 m (6 ft 8 in)	Opposite
Head coach: (Argentina) Javier Weber

=== Former roster ===
Team roster - Season 2023/24
No.	Name	Date of birth	Height	Position
1	Takuya Yasunaga	March 27, 1990 (age 36)	1.94 m (6 ft 4 in)	Middle blocker
2	(United States) Aaron Russell	June 4, 1993 (age 33)	2.05 m (6 ft 9 in)	Outside hitter
3	Makoto Nishimura	October 7, 1998 (age 28)	1.77 m (5 ft 10 in)	Outside hitter
4	Hiromasa Miwa	December 17, 1999 (age 26)	1.92 m (6 ft 4 in)	Middle blocker
5	Shinichiro Inoue (c)	December 21, 1994 (age 31)	1.86 m (6 ft 1 in)	Outside hitter
6	Issei Maeda	September 22, 1991 (age 35)	1.81 m (5 ft 11 in)	Setter
7	Yudai Arai	June 27, 1998 (age 28)	1.88 m (6 ft 2 in)	Outside hitter
8	Koshi Takechi	January 1, 1996 (age 30)	1.86 m (6 ft 1 in)	Outside hitter
9	Kaisei Hirai	February 7, 1999 (age 27)	1.95 m (6 ft 5 in)	Middle blocker
10	Wataru Inoue	July 5, 1994 (age 32)	1.70 m (5 ft 7 in)	Libero
11	Junya Sakashita	June 14, 1998 (age 28)	1.81 m (5 ft 11 in)	Outside hitter
14	Ataru Kumakura	December 17, 1995 (age 30)	1.91 m (6 ft 3 in)	Outside hitter
15	Taishi Karakawa	August 12, 1992 (age 34)	1.70 m (5 ft 7 in)	Libero
16	Chihiro Nishi	November 8, 1997 (age 29)	1.92 m (6 ft 4 in)	Middle blocker
17	Masaki Kaneko	October 23, 1997 (age 29)	1.90 m (6 ft 3 in)	Setter
18	Shohei Yamamoto	March 21, 1991 (age 35)	1.87 m (6 ft 2 in)	Outside hitter
19	(China) Jiang Chuan	August 9, 1994 (age 32)	2.05 m (6 ft 9 in)	Opposite hitter
20	Daiki Abe	February 16, 2000 (age 26)	1.81 m (5 ft 11 in)	Setter
21	Shuto Kawaguchi	August 9, 2000 (age 26)	2.00 m (6 ft 7 in)	Middle blocker
Head coach: (Argentina) Raúl Lozano

Team roster – Season 2022/23
No.	Name	Date of birth	Height	Position
1	Takuya Yasunaga	March 27, 1990 (age 36)	1.94 m (6 ft 4 in)	Middle blocker
2	Taishi Onodera (c)	February 7, 1996 (age 30)	2.02 m (6 ft 8 in)	Middle blocker
3	Makoto Nishimura	October 7, 1998 (age 28)	1.77 m (5 ft 10 in)	Outside hitter
4	Kenta Nakajima	August 25, 1991 (age 35)	1.95 m (6 ft 5 in)	Middle blocker
5	Shinichiro Inoue	December 21, 1994 (age 31)	1.86 m (6 ft 1 in)	Outside hitter
6	(United States) Aaron Russell	June 4, 1993 (age 33)	2.05 m (6 ft 9 in)	Outside hitter
7	Yudai Arai	June 27, 1998 (age 28)	1.88 m (6 ft 2 in)	Outside hitter
8	Koshi Takechi	January 1, 1996 (age 30)	1.86 m (6 ft 1 in)	Outside hitter
9	Kaisei Hirai	February 7, 1999 (age 27)	1.95 m (6 ft 5 in)	Middle blocker
10	Wataru Inoue	July 5, 1994 (age 32)	1.70 m (5 ft 7 in)	Libero
11	Junya Sakashita	June 14, 1998 (age 28)	1.81 m (5 ft 11 in)	Outside hitter
12	Shinpei Goda	September 23, 1992 (age 34)	1.72 m (5 ft 8 in)	Setter
14	Ataru Kumakura	December 17, 1995 (age 30)	1.91 m (6 ft 3 in)	Outside hitter
15	Taishi Karakawa	August 12, 1992 (age 34)	1.70 m (5 ft 7 in)	Libero
16	Chihiro Nishi	November 8, 1997 (age 29)	1.92 m (6 ft 4 in)	Middle blocker
17	Masaki Kaneko	October 23, 1997 (age 29)	1.90 m (6 ft 3 in)	Setter
18	Shohei Yamamoto	March 21, 1991 (age 35)	1.87 m (6 ft 2 in)	Outside hitter
19	(China) Jiang Chuan	August 9, 1994 (age 32)	2.05 m (6 ft 9 in)	Opposite hitter
20	Daiki Abe	February 16, 2000 (age 26)	1.81 m (5 ft 11 in)	Setter
21	Shuto Kawaguchi In	August 9, 2000 (age 26)	2.00 m (6 ft 7 in)	Middle blocker
Head coach: (Argentina) Raúl Lozano

== League results ==
Champion Runner-up

League		Position	Teams	Matches	Win	Lose
V.League	1st (1994–95)	5th	8	21	10	11
V.League	2nd (1995–96)	3rd	8	21	13	8
V.League	3rd (1996–97)	Runner-up	8	21	14	7
V.League	4th (1997–98)	8th	8	21	3	18
V.League	5th (1998–99)	7th	10	18	6	12
V.League	6th (1999-00)	5th	10	18	10	8
V.League	7th (2000–01)	Runner-up	10	18	13	5
V.League	8th (2001–02)	5th	10	18	11	7
V.League	9th (2002–03)	Runner-up	8	21	15	6
V.League	10th (2003–04)	Runner-up	8	21	13	8
V.League	11th (2004–05)	3rd	8	28	17	11
V.League	12th (2005–06)	4th	8	28	16	12
V・Premier	2006-07	5th	8	28	14	14
V・Premier	2007-08	6th	8	28	12	16
V・Premier	2008-09	5th	8	28	14	14
V・Premier	2009-10	6th	8	28	14	14
V・Premier	2010-11	5th	8	24	12	12
V・Premier	2011-12	7th	8	21	7	14
V・Premier	2012-13	6th	8	28	9	19
V・Premier	2013-14	Runner-up	8	28	18	10
V・Premier	2014-15	Champion	8	27	20	7
V・Premier	2015–16	5th	8	26	12	14
V・Premier	2016–17	7th	8	21	7	14
V・Premier	2017–18	3rd	8	29	17	12
V.League Division 1
V.League Division 1	2018–19	Runner-up	10	32	21	11
V.League Division 1	2019–20	4th	10	28	21	7
V.League Division 1	2020–21	6th	10	36	17	19
V.League Division 1	2022–23	7th	10	36	16	20
SV.League	2024-25	6th	10	46	18	28
SV.League	2025-26	5th	10	46	21	25

== Notable foreign players ==
- (Russia) Igor Shulepov 1999-2000
- (Russia) Ilya Savelev 2001-2004
- (United States) Gabriel Gardner 2005-2006
- (Ukraine) Maksym Panteleymonenko 2007-2008
- (Venezuela) Ernardo Gómez 2008-2012
- (Croatia) Igor Omrcen 2012-2014
- (Brazil) Leandro Vissotto 2014-2015
- (Serbia) Dražen Luburić 2016-2017
- (Australia) Thomas Edgar 2017–2022
- (China) Liu Libin 2018-2019
- (Taiwan) Chen Chien-Chen 2019–2022
