= Matsue City General Gymnasium =

Sports arena in Matsue, Japan

Coordinates: 35°28′17.2″N 133°03′58.1″E

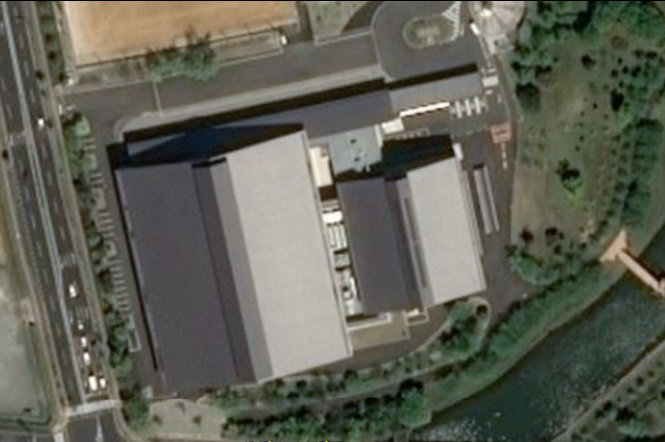
- Interactive map of Matsue City General Gymnasium
- Full name: Matsue City General Gymnasium
- Location: Matsue, Shimane, Japan
- Owner: Matsue city
- Operator: Matsue city
- Parking: 393 spaces

Construction
- Opened: April. 2016
- Cost

Tenant
- Shimane Susanoo Magic

Website
- https://www.so-tai.jp/

Matsue City General Gymnasium is an arena in Matsue, Shimane, Japan. It is the home arena of the Shimane Susanoo Magic of the B.League, Japan's professional basketball league.

== Facilities ==
- Maun arena - 2,747m^{2}（67m×41m×16m）
- Sub arena - 1,394m^{2}（41m×34m×13m）
