= Sumida City Gymnasium =

Sports venue in Tokyo, Japan

Coordinates: 35°41′57.9″N 139°49′1.6″E

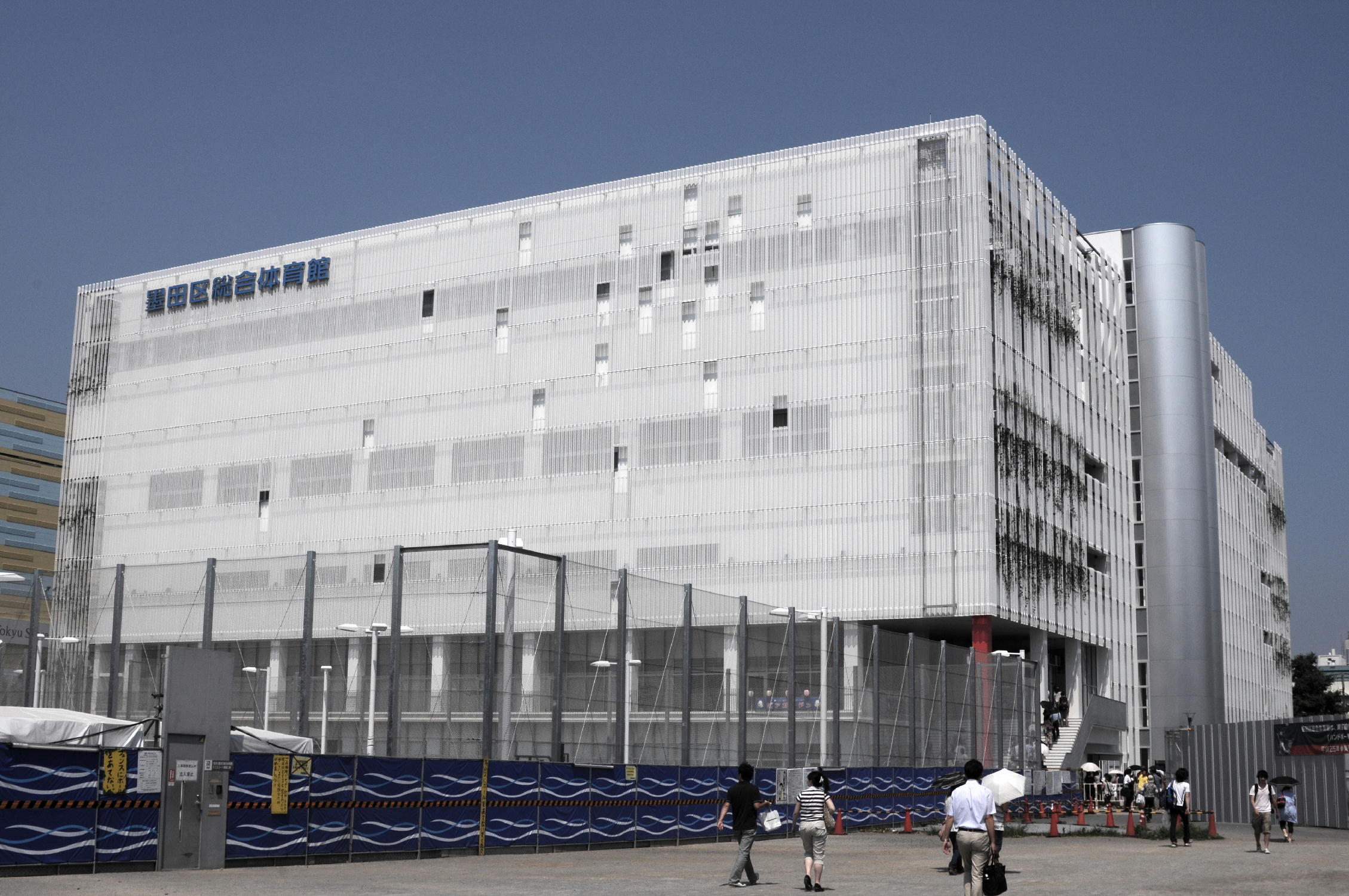
- Interactive map of Sumida City Gymnasium
- Full name: Sumida City General Gymnasium
- Location: Sumida, Tokyo, Japan
- Owner: Sumida-ku
- Operator: Sumida Sports Support FPI
- Parking: 100 spaces

Construction
- Opened: April 1, 2010
- Cost: JPY 8.7 billion
- Architect: Nihon Sekkei
- Main contractor: Kajima

Tenant
- Fugador Sumida

Website
- http://www.sumidacity-gym.com/language/english/

Sumida City Gymnasium (墨田区総合体育館) is a multi-purpose arena in Sumida, Tokyo, Japan. It is the home venue for Fugador Sumida from the Japanese futsal league, and also is the secondary venue for the Sun Rockers Shibuya basketball team.

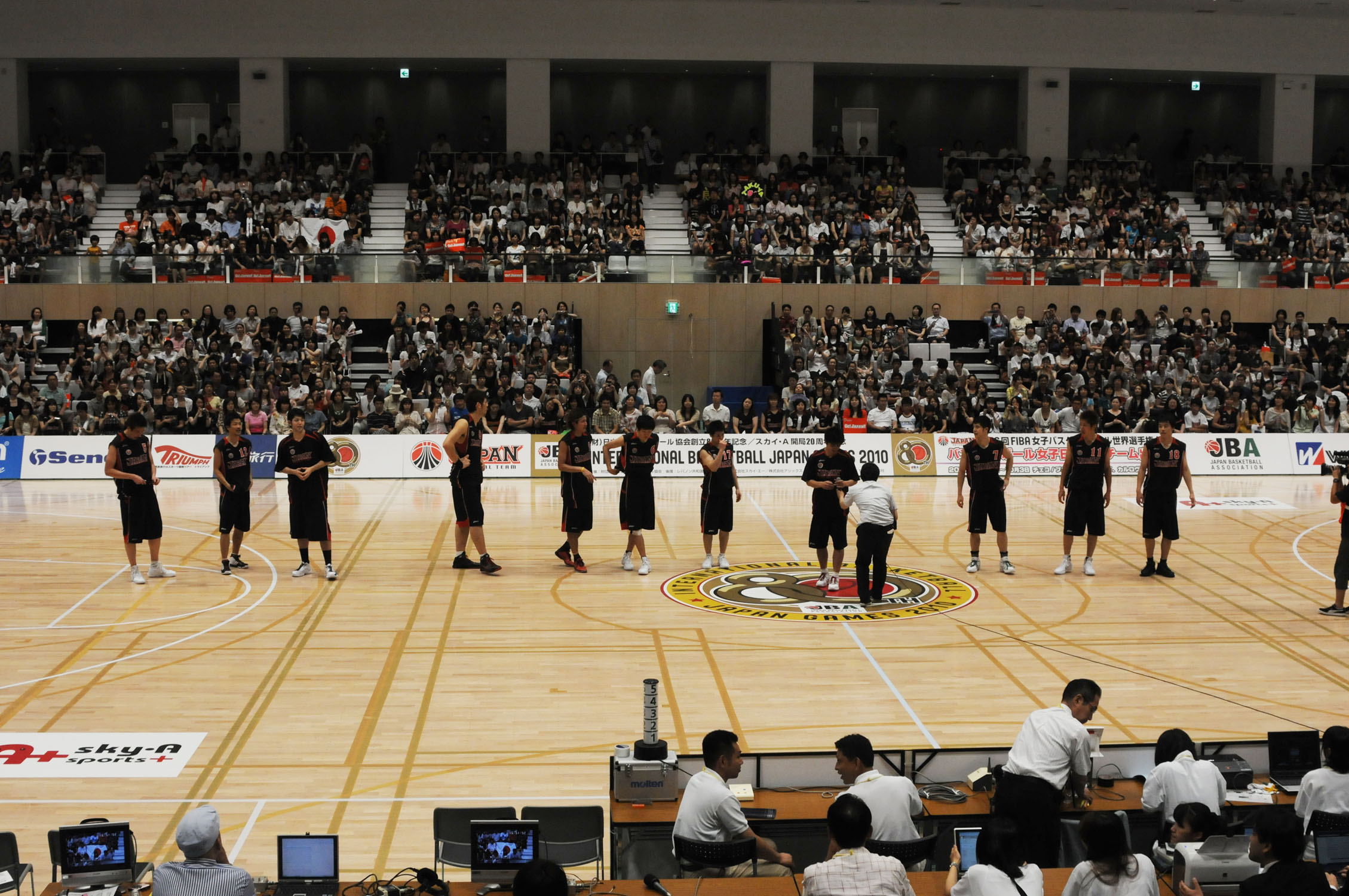
Arena

== Facilities ==
- Rooftop Facilities （5th Floor）, Multi-purpose Athletics Field and Multi-purpose Area
- Spectator Stand and Running Course （4th Floor）
- Main and Sub-arenas （3rd Floor）
- Reception, Budo hall, Training Room, Studio and Cafeteria, Exhibition site of Sadaharu Oh, a Japanese baseball legend and a home-run king from Sumida （2nd Floor）
- Indoor Pool and Parking Lot (1st Floor)

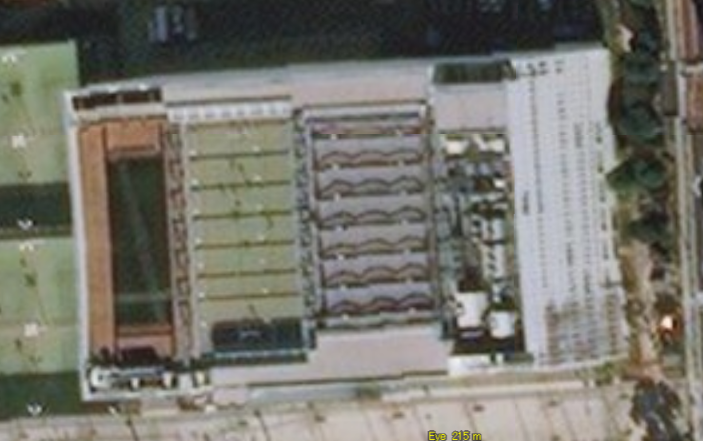
Satellite view
