= FC Tokyo (volleyball) =

Japanese volleyball club

F.C. Tokyo
- Short name: F.C. Tokyo
- Founded: 1948
- Dissolved: 2022 (became Tokyo Great Bears)
- Ground: Tokyo Gas Gymnasium; Kōtō, Tokyo, Japan
- League: V.League Division 1
- Website: Club home page

The F.C. Tokyo Volleyball Team (FC東京バレーボールチーム, FC Tokyo Barēbōru Chīmu) (FC東京) is a men's volleyball team based in Koto, Tokyo, Japan. It plays in V.Premier League. The owner of the team is Tokyo Gas.

== History ==
- It was founded in 1948 as a 9-men volleyball circle of Tokyo Gas.
- It promoted to V.Challenge League in 1998.
- In April 2009, it won the V.challenge match, so it will promote to the V.Premier League next season.
- In December 2021, it was announced that FC Tokyo's volleyball team would suspend operations after the 2021-22 V. League season.
- In May 2022, FC Tokyo managed under Nature Lab in V. League from next season.
- In June 2022, FC Tokyo became Tokyo Great Bears

== Honours ==
Emperor's Cup

- Runner-up (1): 2011

Domestic Sports Festival

- Champion (1): 2011

== League results ==
League		Position	Teams	Matches	Win	Lose
V・Premier
V・Premier	2009-10	8th	8	28	4	24
V・Premier	2010-11	7th	8	24	6	18
V・Premier	2011-12	5th	8	21	8	13
V・Premier	2012-13	7th	8	28	8	20
V・Premier	2013-14	7th	8	28	7	21
V・Premier	2014-15	8th	8	21	2	19
V・Premier	2015–16	8th	8	21	4	17
V・Premier	2016–17	8th	8	21	3	18
V・Premier	2017–18	8th	8	21	2	19
V・League Division 1	2018–19	8th	10	27	8	19
V・League Division 1	2019–20	8th	10	27	6	21
V・League Division 1	2020–21	8th	10	35	8	27
V・League Division 1	2021–22	8th	10	34	9	25
