= Jason DeRocco =

Canadian volleyball player (born 1989)

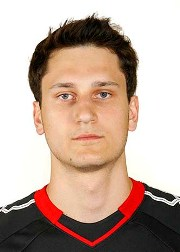
- DeRocco in 2013

Personal information
- Full name: Jason DeRocco
- Born: 19 September 1989 (age 37); East St. Paul, Manitoba, Canada
- Height: 198 cm (6 ft 6 in)
- Weight: 93 kg (205 lb)
- Spike: 348 cm (137 in)
- Block: 330 cm (130 in)
- Education: University of Alberta; Northwood University

Volleyball information
- Position: Outside hitter
- Current club: Jastrzębski Weigel
- Number: 9

Career
Years	Teams
2005–2008; 2008–2011; 2011–2012; 2012–2013; 2013; 2014; 2014–2015; 2015–	University of Alberta; Northwood University; Kifissia V.C. Saint-Nazaire VB; Andreoli Latina; Nantes Rezé Métropole; Afyonkarahisar Belediyespor; Jastrzębski Węgiel

National team
2013–	Canada
Honours
Representing Canada
Men's Volleyball
Norceca Continental Championship
Bronze medal – third place	2019 Winnipeg	{{{2}}}
FIVB World League
Bronze medal – third place	2017 Curitiba
- Last updated: 7 September 2019

Jason DeRocco (born 19 September 1989) is a Canadian male volleyball player. He was part of the Canada men's national volleyball team. On club level he played for Jastrzębski Węgiel.

== Sporting achievements ==
=== Clubs ===
==== National championship ====
- 2016/2017 Polish Championship, with Jastrzębski Węgiel

=== National team ===
- 2017 FIVB World League
- 2020 EASHL Playoff MVP with DEER LAKE RED WINGS (5 Goals, 3 Assists)
