= Okinawa City Gymnasium =

Arena in Okinawa, Okinawa Prefecture, Japan

Coordinates: 26°19′57.8″N 127°47′12.7″E

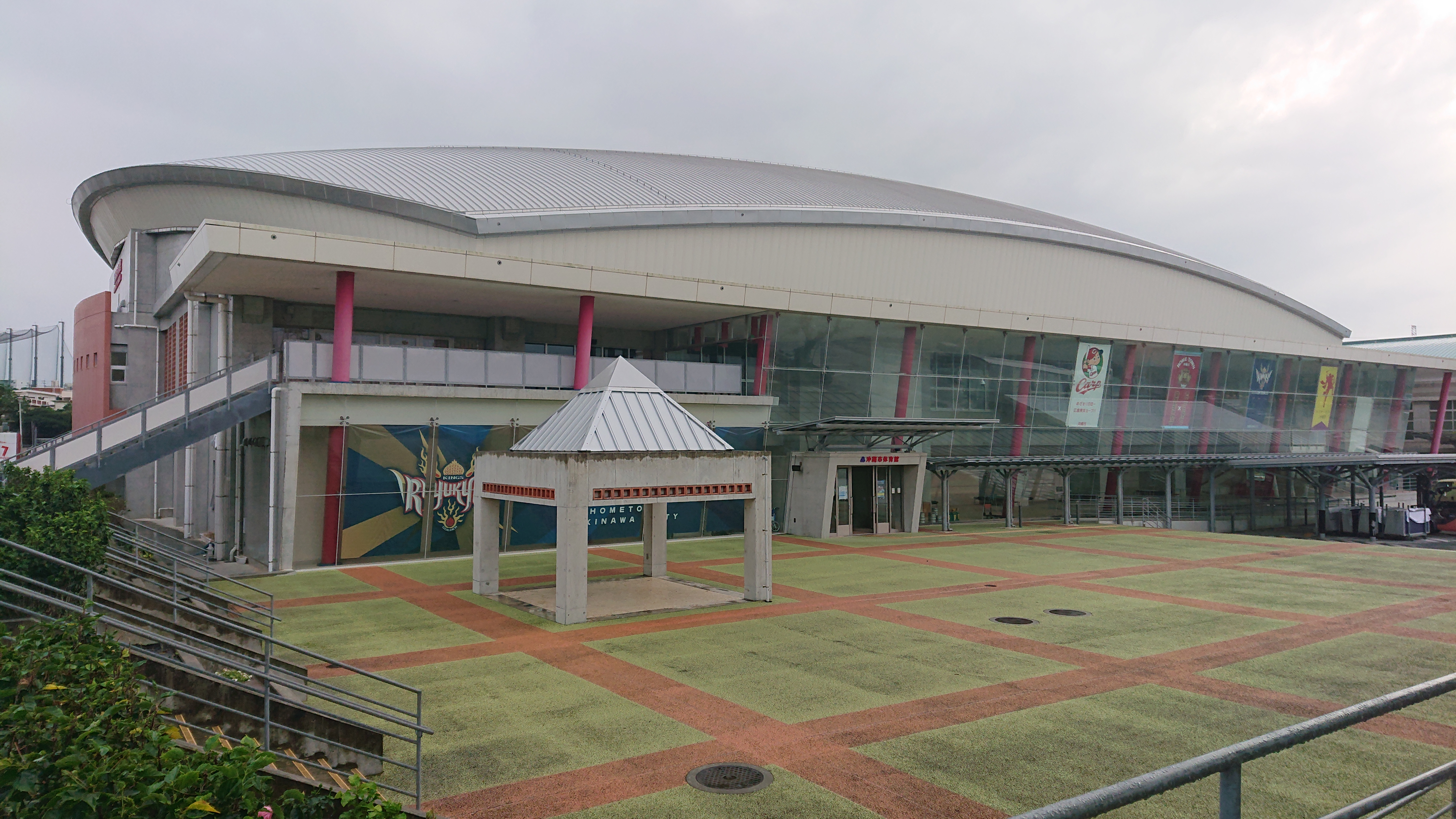
- Interactive map of Okinawa City Gymnasium
- Full name: Okinawa City Gymnasium
- Location: Okinawa, Okinawa, Japan
- Owner: Okinawa city
- Operator: Okinawa city
- Capacity: 2,123
- Scoreboard: Centerhung scoreboard

Construction
- Opened: March, 2010
- Cost

Tenant
- Ryukyu Golden Kings

Website
- http://kozaspo.jp/gymnasiummn.html

Okinawa City Gymnasium is an arena in Okinawa, Okinawa, Japan. It is the home arena of the Ryukyu Golden Kings of the B.League, Japan's professional basketball league.

== Gallery ==
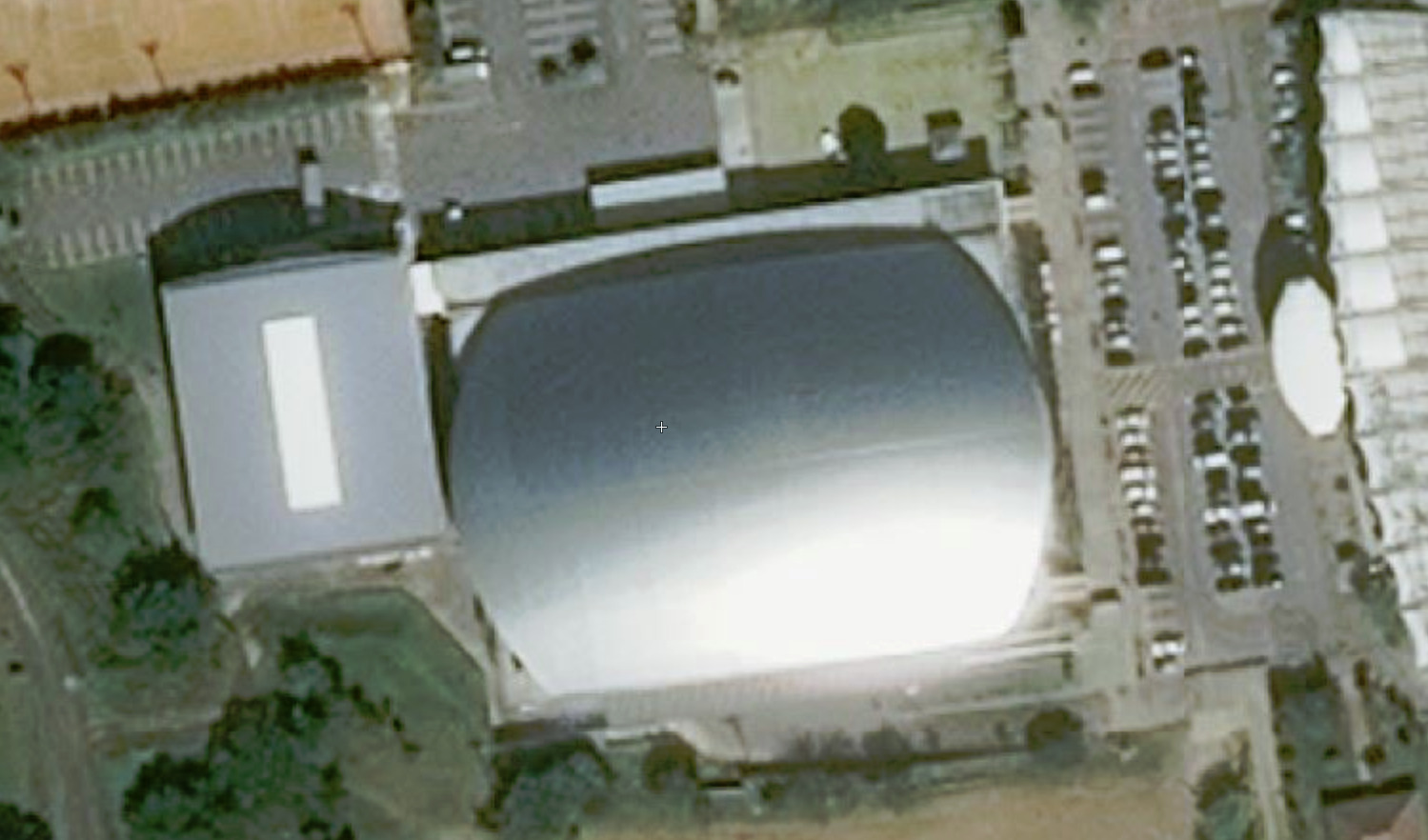
Satellite view

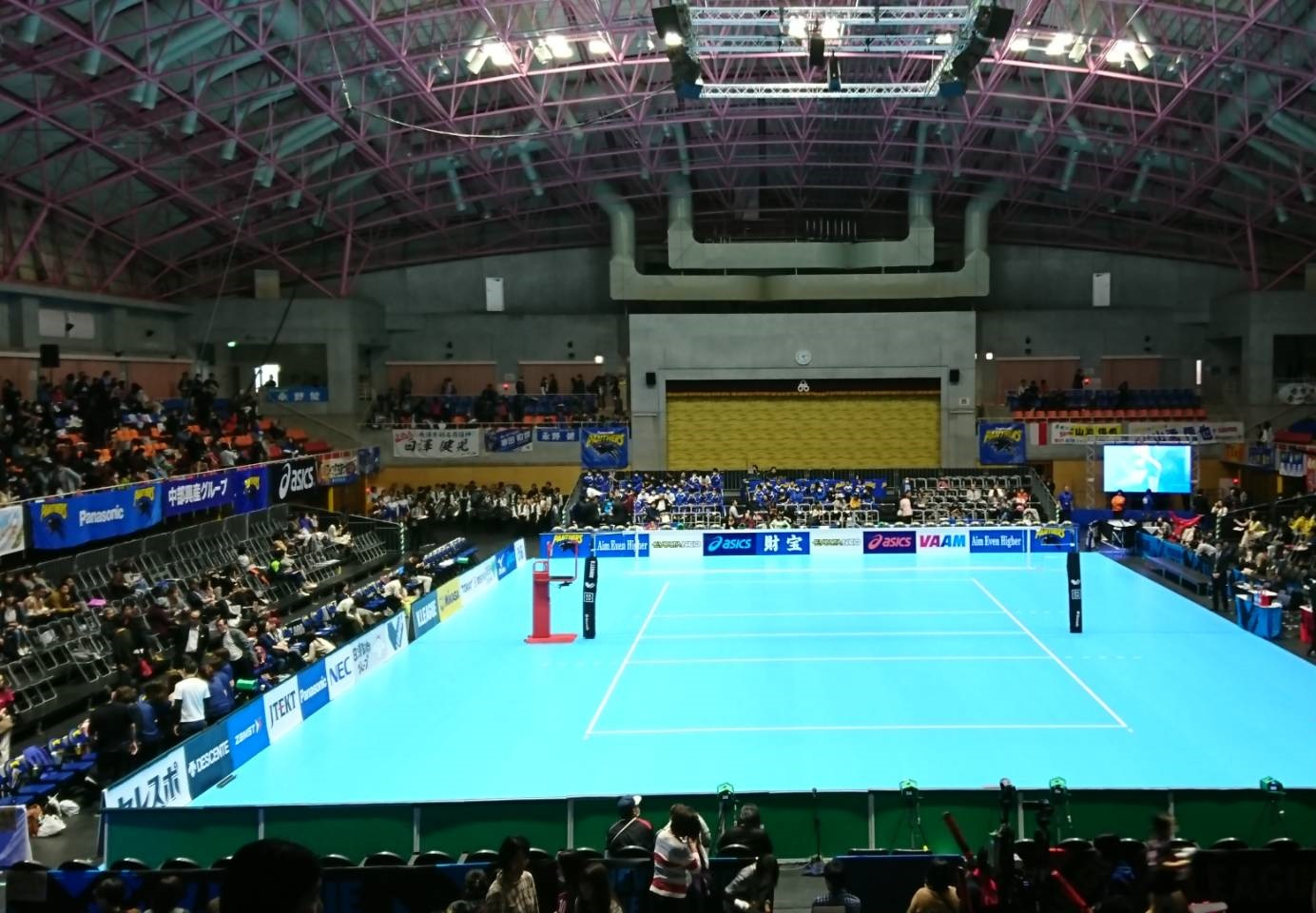

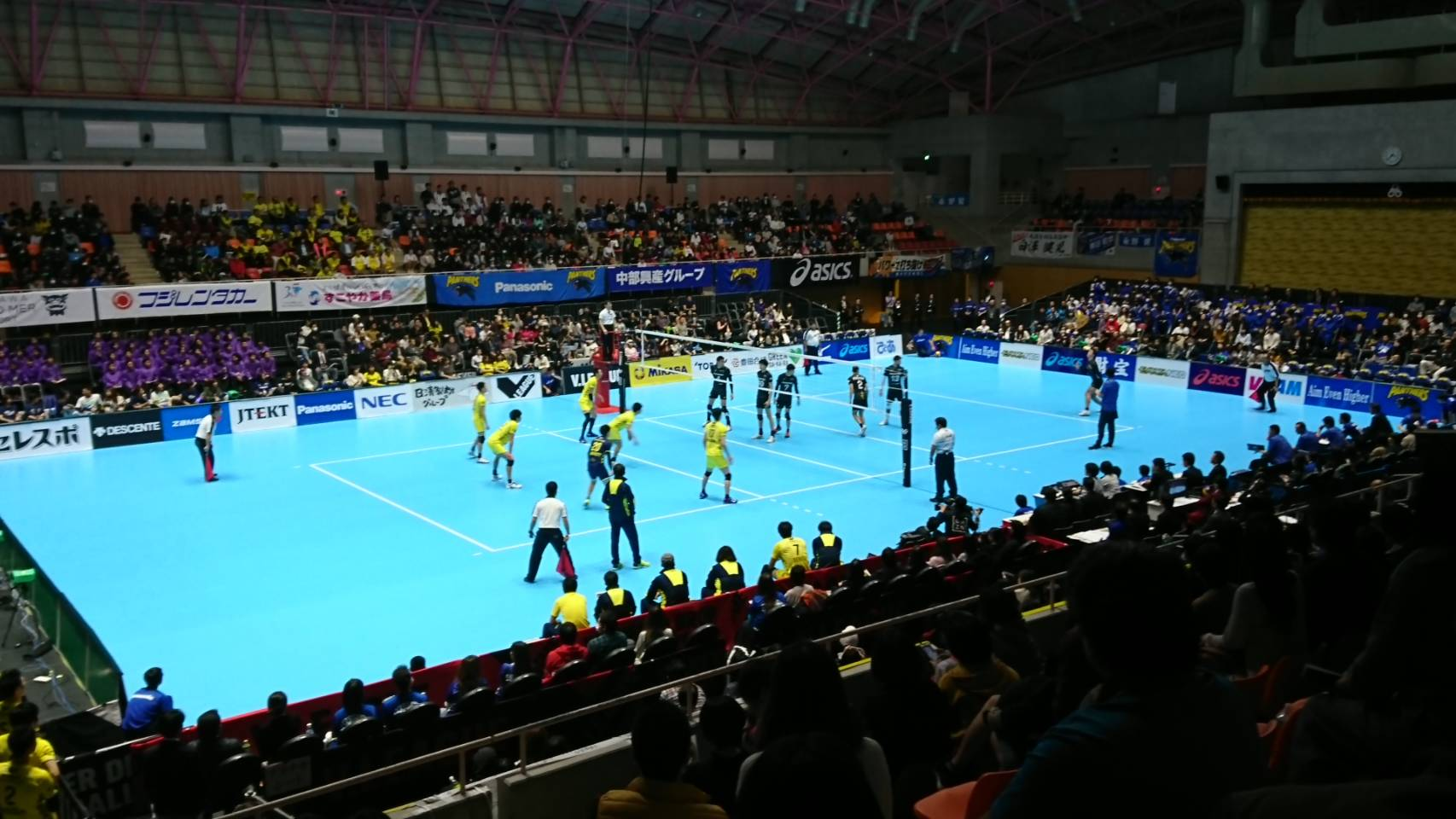

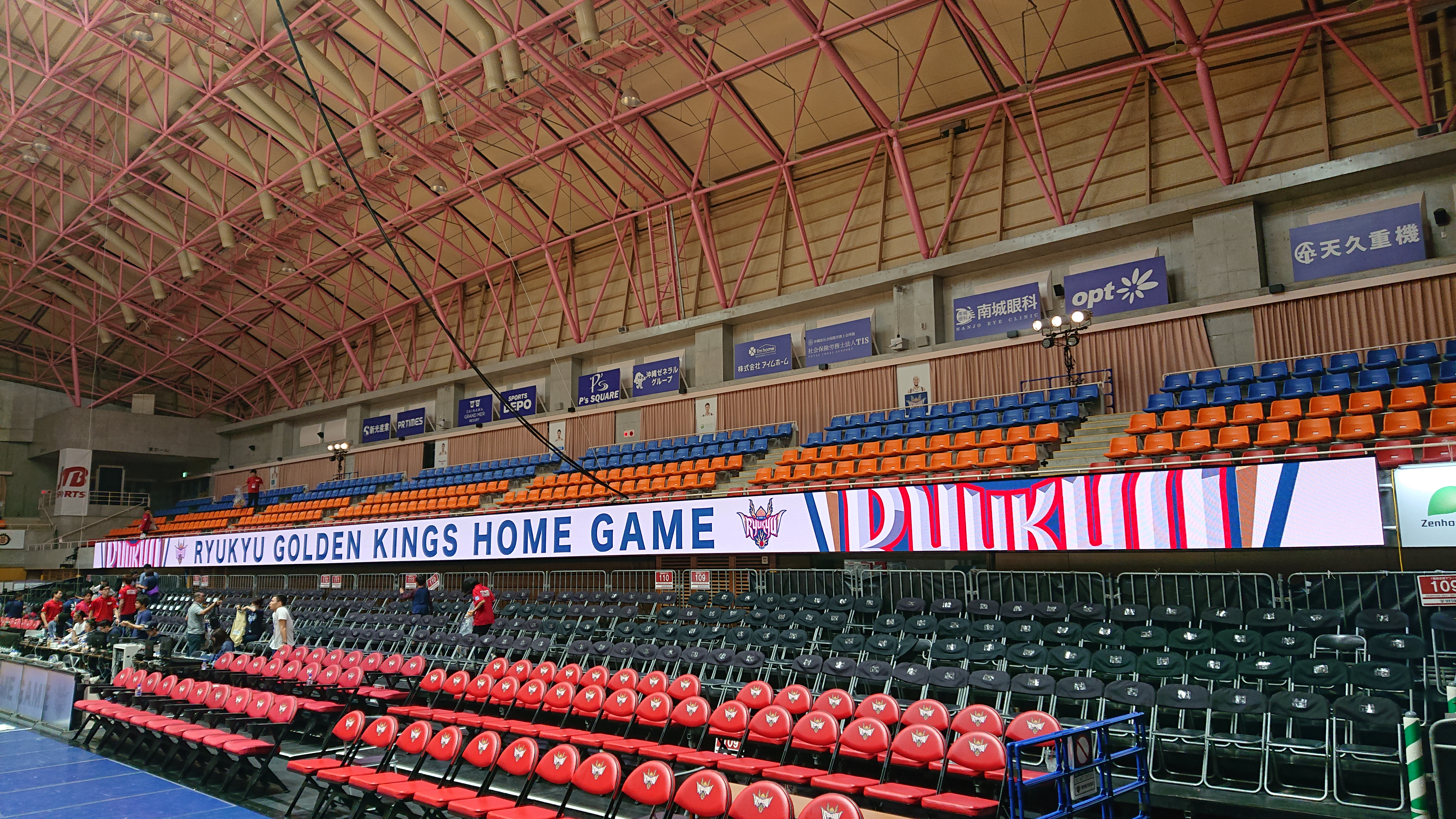
Ribbon

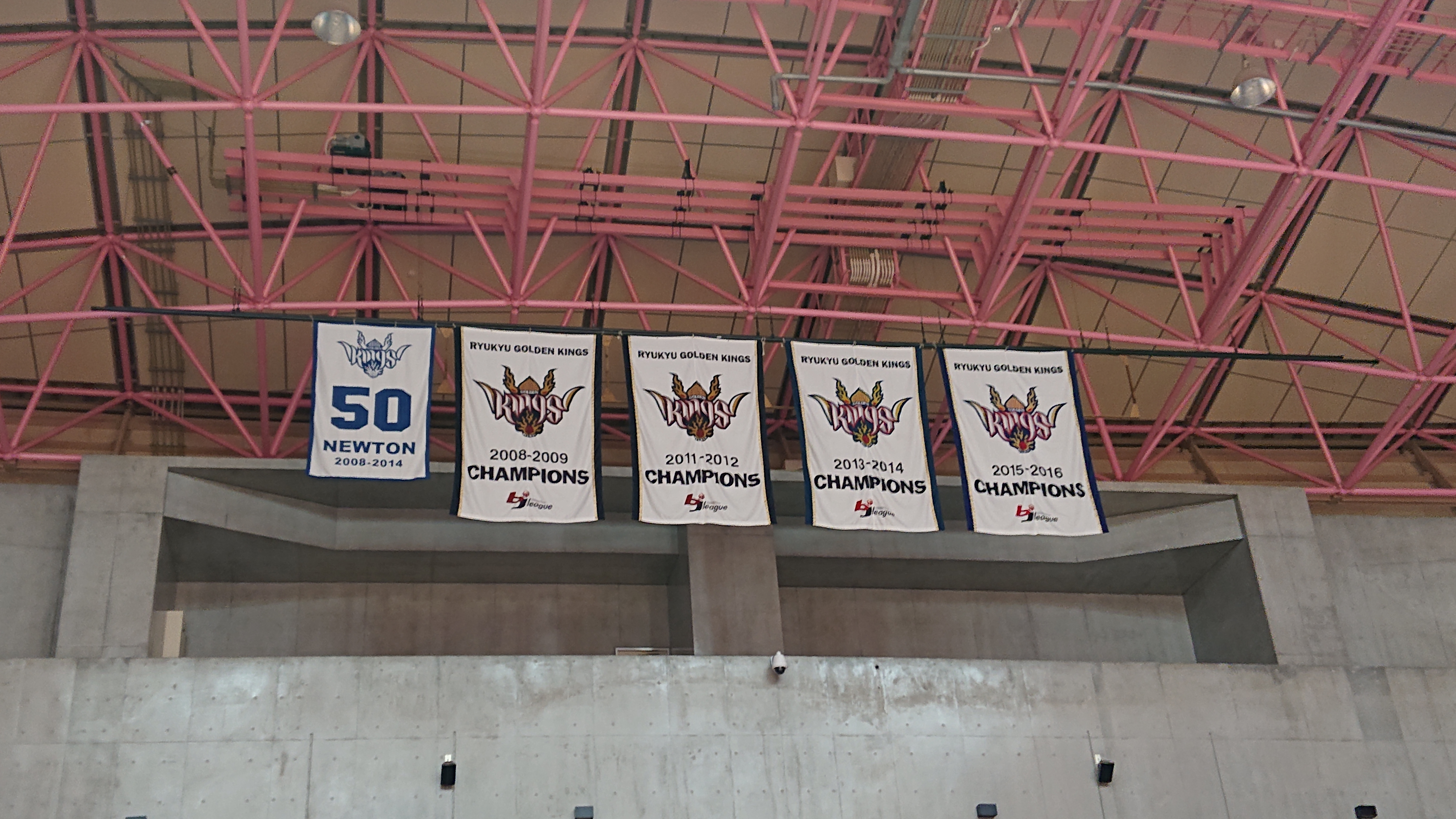
Champion flags

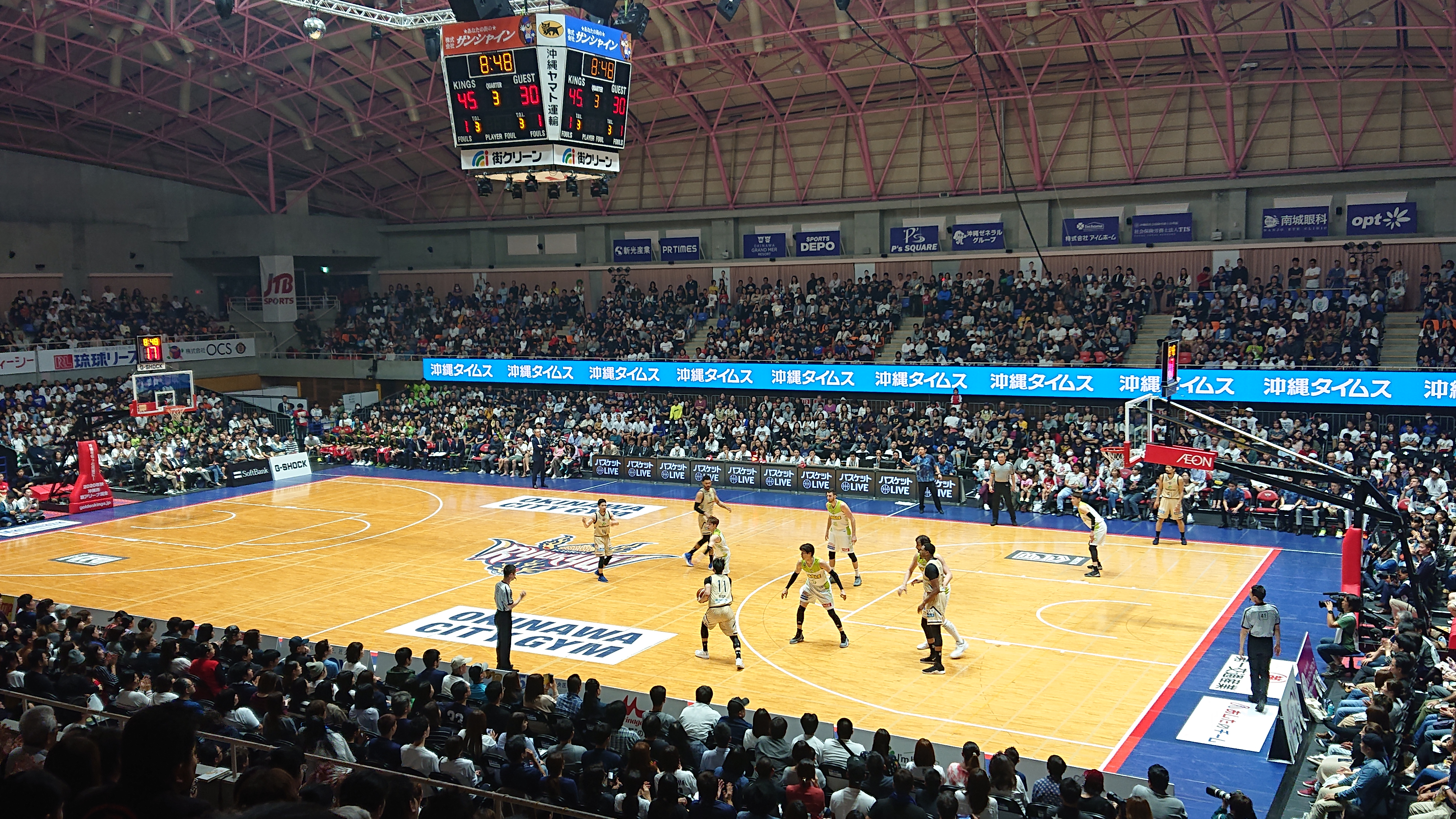

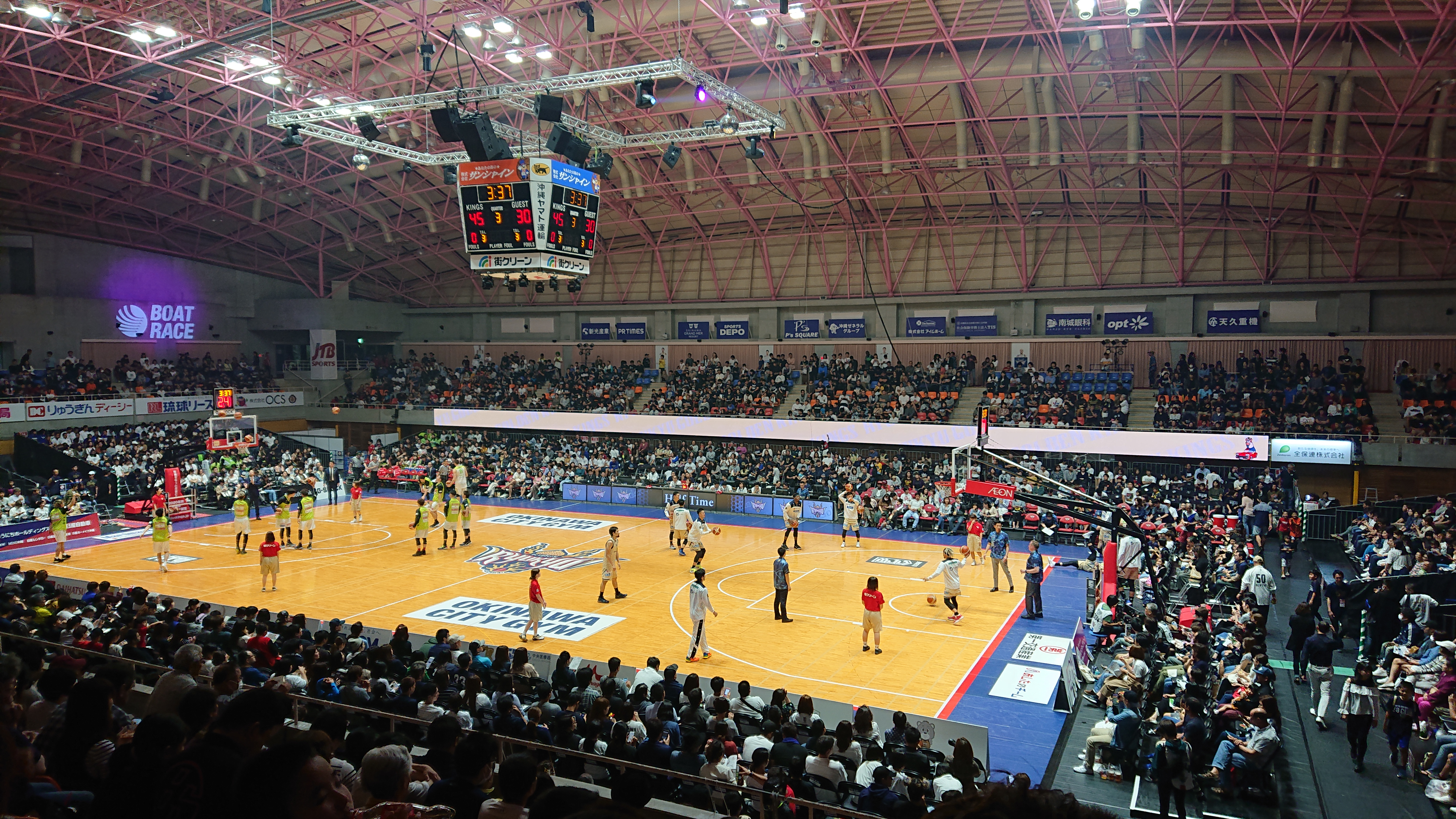
