= Thomas Edgar (volleyball) =

Australian volleyball player (born 1989)

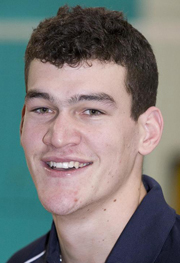

Personal information
- Full name: Thomas Edgar
- Nationality: Australia
- Born: 21 June 1989 (age 37) Bundaberg, Australia
- Height: 2.12 m (6 ft 11 in)
- Weight: 106 kg (234 lb)
- Spike: 357 cm (141 in)
- Block: 341 cm (134 in)

Volleyball information
- Position: Opposite Spiker
- Current club: Al Ain FC
- Number: 6

Career
- Years: Team
- 2008–2010 2010–2011 2011–2012 2012–2013 2013–2015 2015–2016 2016–2017 2017–2022 2022–2023 2023–: (Sweden) Linkoping VC (Poland) LOTOS Trefl Gdańsk (Italy) Volley Corigliano (Italy) Sir Safety Perugia (South Korea) LIG Insurance Greaters (China) Beijing Baic Motor (Argentina) Drean Bolivar (Japan) JT Thunders (Turkey) Galatasaray (United Arab Emirates) Al Ain FC

National team
- Years: Team
- 2009–: Australia
Honours
Representing Australia
Men's volleyball
Asian Championship
| Silver medal – second place | 2019 Tehran | Team |

Thomas Edgar (born 21 June 1989) is an Australian volleyball player. He competed for Australia at the 2012 Summer Olympics.

== Career ==
He began his career in Queensland. In the 2011–2012 season he played for the Italian Serie A2 club, Volley Corigliano. In the following season, Edgar transferred to Serie A1 club Sir Safety Perugia. In 2013 he moved to South Korea to play for LIG Insurance Greaters. In 2015 he played in the Chinese Volleyball League for Beijing. Thomas has been the captain of the team since 2015.

On 12 August 2022, he signed a one-year contract with Galatasaray, one of the Turkish Men's Volleyball League teams.

== Sporting achievements ==
- 2019 Asian Men's Volleyball Championship – Most Valuable Player

=== Record ===
We emphasize that Edgar's record relates only to games under the patronage of the International Volleyball Federation. There are players that scored more points in other competitions. The match Australia – Egypt will also be remembered by another record the highest number of points collected by rival opposites Edgar's 50 points.
