= Milan Pepić =

Bosnian volleyball player (born 1984)

Personal information
- Nationality: Serb
- Born: 20 December 1984 (age 41); Tuzla
- Hometown: Zvornik

Volleyball information
- Current club: OK Crvena Zvezda Beograd
- Number: 6

National team
Bosnia and Herzegovina

Milan Pepić (born 20 December 1984) is a Serbian male volleyball player.

== Clubs ==
- OK Student Pale (2004–2005)
- OK Modriča (2005–2007)
- MOK Osijek (2007–2008)
- OK Prvačina (2008–2010)
- Gumi KB Insurance Stars (2010–2012)
- Osaka Blazers Sakai (2012–present)
