= Japanese cuisine =

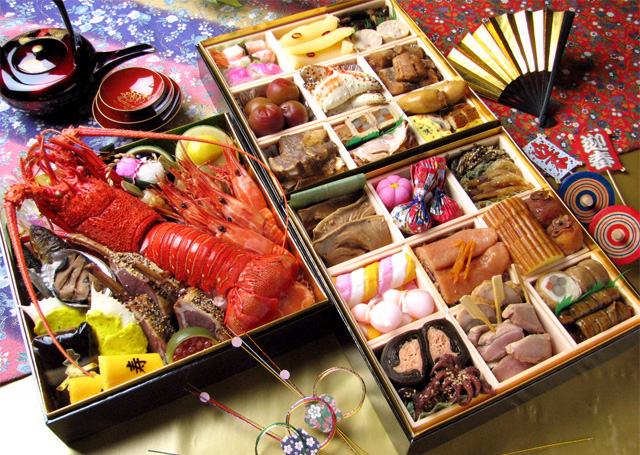
Osechi, new year special dishes

Japanese cuisine encompasses the regional and traditional foods of Japan, which have developed through centuries of political, economic, and social changes. The traditional cuisine of Japan (Japanese: washoku) is based on rice with miso soup and other dishes with an emphasis on seasonal ingredients. Side dishes often consist of fish, pickled vegetables, tamagoyaki, and vegetables cooked in broth. Common seafood is often grilled, but it is also sometimes served raw as sashimi or as sushi. Seafood and vegetables are also deep-fried in a light batter, as tempura. Apart from rice, a staple includes noodles, such as soba and udon. Japan also has many simmered dishes, such as fish products in broth called oden, or beef in sukiyaki and nikujaga.

Historically influenced by Chinese cuisine, Japanese cuisine has also opened up to influence from Western cuisines in the modern era. Dishes inspired by foreign food—in particular Chinese food—like ramen and gyōza, as well as foods like spaghetti, curry and hamburgers, have been adapted to Japanese tastes and ingredients. Traditionally, the Japanese shunned meat as a result of adherence to Buddhism, but with the modernization of Japan in the 1880s, meat-based dishes such as tonkatsu and yakiniku have become common. Since this time, Japanese cuisine, particularly sushi and ramen, has become popular globally.

In 2011, Japan overtook France to become the country with the most 3-starred Michelin restaurants; as of 2018, the capital of Tokyo has maintained the title of the city with the most 3-starred restaurants in the world. In 2013, Japanese cuisine was added to the UNESCO Intangible Heritage List.

== History ==
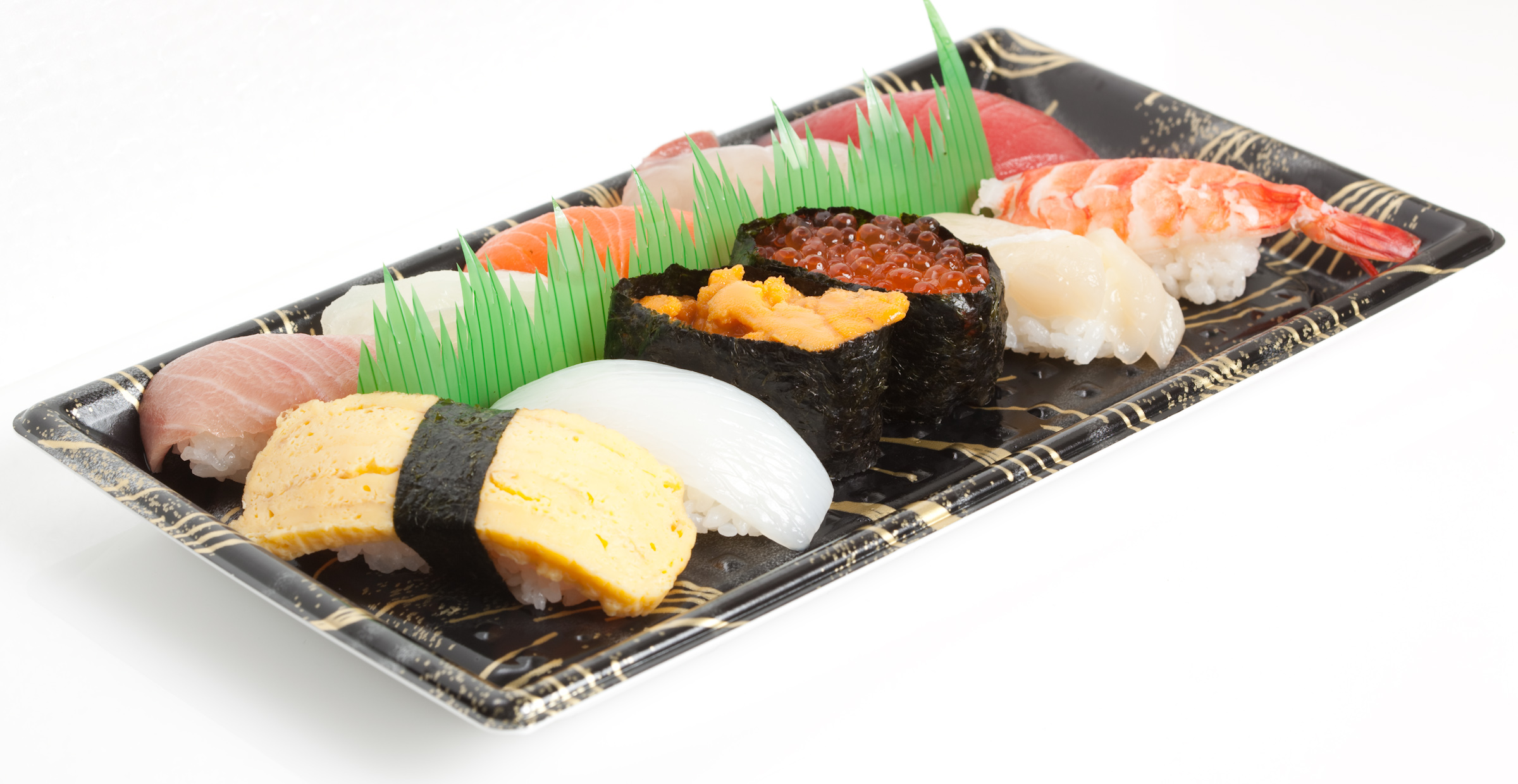
Sushi

Rice is a staple in Japanese cuisine. Wheat and soybeans were introduced shortly after rice. All three act as staple foods in Japanese cuisine today. At the end of the Kofun period and beginning of the Asuka period, Buddhism became the official religion of the country. Therefore, eating meat and fish was prohibited. In 675 AD, Emperor Tenmu prohibited the eating of horses, dogs, monkeys, and chickens. In the 8th and 9th centuries, many emperors continued to prohibit killing many types of animals. However, meat continued to be eaten in some areas. In Kagoshima, pig farming flourished, and in Oumi, there was a culture of eating beef. In addition, in the Suwa region, there was a ritual of deer sacrifice for Shinto rituals. The number of regulated meats increased significantly, leading to the banning of all mammals except whale, which were categorized as fish. During the Asuka period, chopsticks were introduced to Japan. Initially, they were used only by the nobility. The general population used their hands, as utensils were quite expensive.

Due to the lack of meat products, Japanese people minimized spice utilization. Spices were rare to find at the time. Spices, like pepper and garlic, were used only in a minimalist amount. Spices widely used in Japan were sansho and black pepper. They were often used in noodle, white rice, and fish dishes. They were also used as a nourishing medicine. In the absence of meat, fish was served as the main protein, as Japan is an island nation. Fish has influenced many iconic Japanese dishes today. In the 9th century, grilled fish and sliced raw fish were widely popular. Japanese people who could afford it would eat fish at every meal; others would have to make do without animal protein for many of their meals. In traditional Japanese cuisine, oil and fat are usually avoided during the cooking process in order to maintain a healthy lifestyle.

Preserving fish became a sensation and sushi originated as a means of preserving fish by fermenting it in boiled rice. Fish that are salted and then placed in rice are preserved by lactic acid fermentation, which helps prevent the proliferation of the bacteria that bring about putrefaction. During the 15th century, advancement and development helped shorten the fermentation of sushi to about one to two weeks. Sushi thus became popular both as a main meal and as a snack food, combining fish with rice. During the late Edo period (early 19th century), sushi without fermentation was introduced. Sushi was still being consumed with and without fermentation till the 19th century when the hand-rolled and nigiri-type sushi was invented.

In 1854, Japan started to enter new trade deals with Western countries. The concept of washoku (Japanese cuisine) was introduced in Japan following negotiations with the United States on a trade treaty. When Emperor Meiji took power in 1868 as part of the Meiji Restoration, the government began to adopt Western customs, including the use of animal products in food. The new ruler staged a New Year's feast designed to embrace the Western world and countries in 1872. The feast contained food that reflected European cuisine. For the first time in a thousand years, people were allowed to consume meat in public, and the general population started to include meat in their regular diets.

== Culture ==
=== Terminology ===
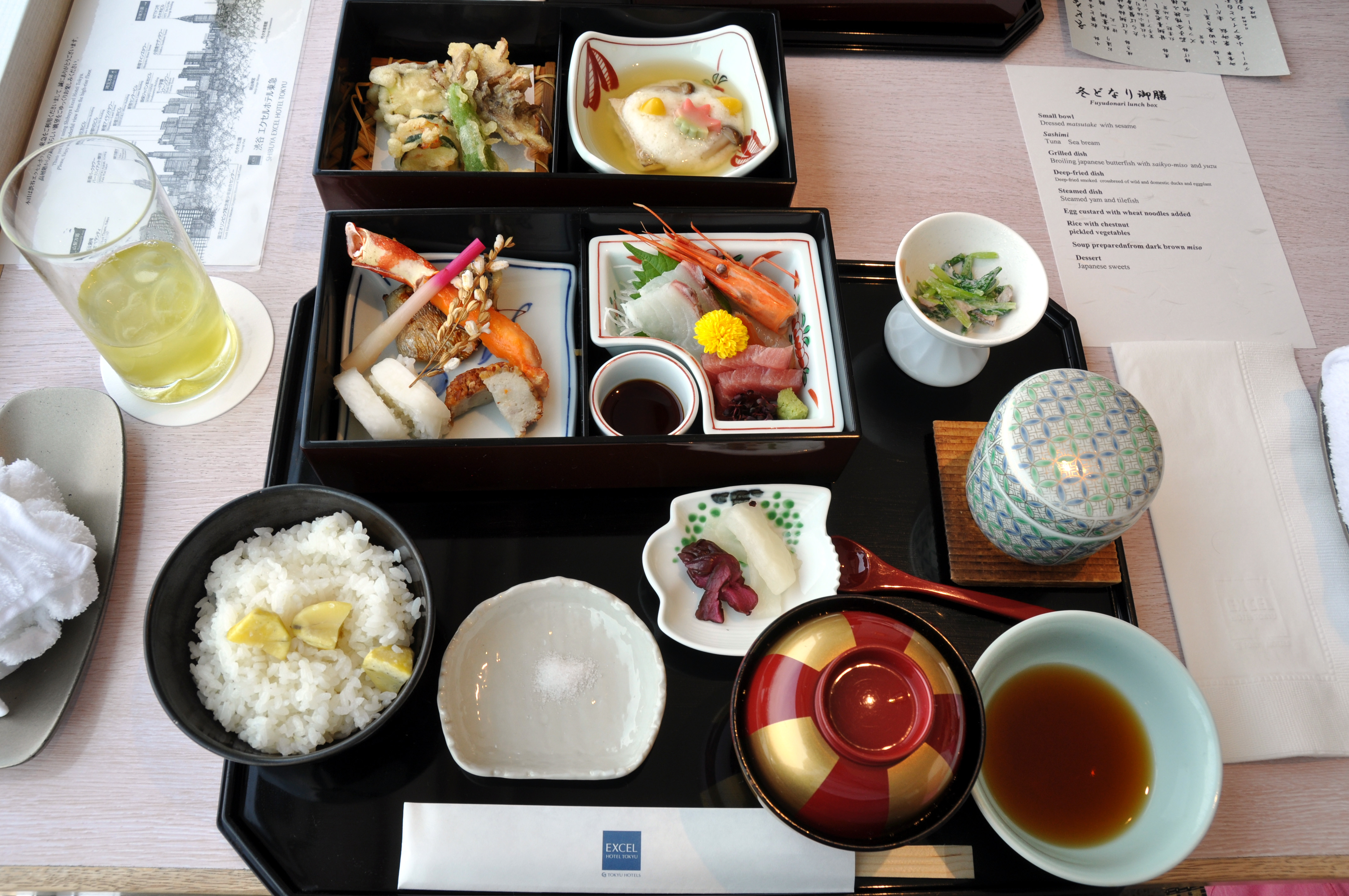
A Japanese meal including tempura, sashimi, and miso soup

The word washoku (和食) is now the common word for traditional Japanese cooking. The term kappō (割烹; lit. "cutting and boiling (meats)") is synonymous with "cooking", but became a reference to mostly Japanese cooking, or restaurants, and was much used in the Meiji and Taishō eras. It has come to connote a certain standard, perhaps even of the highest caliber, a restaurant with the most highly trained chefs. However, kappō is generally seen as an eating establishment which is slightly more casual or informal compared to the kaiseki.

The kaiseki (懐石, lit. "warming stone") is tied with the Japanese tea ceremony. The kaiseki is considered a (simplified) form of honzen-ryōri (本膳料理, lit. "main tray cooking"), which was formal banquet dining where several trays of food were served. The homophone term kaiseki ryōri (会席料理, lit. "gathering + seating") originally referred to a gathering of composers of haiku or renga, and the simplified version of the honzen dishes served at the poem parties became kaiseki ryōri. However, the meaning of kaiseki ryōri degenerated to become just another term for a sumptuous carousing banquet, or shuen (酒宴).

=== Traditional table settings ===
The traditional Japanese table setting has varied considerably over the centuries, depending primarily on the type of table common during a given era. Before the 19th century, small individual box tables (hakozen, 箱膳) or flat floor trays were set before each diner. Larger low tables (chabudai, ちゃぶ台) that accommodated entire families were gaining popularity by the beginning of the 20th century, but these gave way to Western-style dining tables and chairs by the end of the 20th century.

The traditional Japanese table setting is to place a bowl of rice on the diner's left and to place a bowl of miso soup on the diner's right side at the table. Behind these, each okazu is served on its own individual plate. Based on the standard three-okazu formula, behind the rice and soup are three flat plates to hold the three okazu; one to far back left, one at far back right, and one in the center. Pickled vegetables are often served on the side but are not counted as part of the three okazu. Chopsticks are generally placed at the very front of the tray near the diner with pointed ends facing left and supported by a chopstick rest, or hashioki.

=== Dining etiquette ===
Many restaurants and homes in Japan are equipped with Western-style chairs and tables. However, traditional Japanese low tables and cushions, usually found on tatami floors, are also very common. Tatami mats, which are made of straw, can be easily damaged and are hard to clean, thus shoes or any type of footwear are always taken off when stepping on tatami floors.

When dining in a traditional tatami room, sitting upright on the floor is common. In a casual setting, men usually sit with their feet crossed and women sit with both legs to one side. Only men are supposed to sit cross-legged. The formal way of sitting for both sexes is a kneeling style known as seiza. To sit in a seiza position, one kneels on the floor with legs folded under the thighs and the buttocks resting on the heels.

When dining out in a restaurant, the customers are guided to their seats by the host. The honored or eldest guest will usually be seated at the center of the table farthest from the entrance. In the home, the most important guest is also seated farthest away from the entrance. If there is a tokonoma, or alcove, in the room, the guest is seated in front of it. The host sits next to or closest to the entrance.

In Japan, it is customary to say itadakimasu ("I [humbly] receive") before starting to eat a meal. When saying itadakimasu, both hands are put together in front of the chest or on the lap. Itadakimasu is preceded by complimenting the appearance of food. Another customary and important etiquette is to say go-chisō-sama deshita ("It was a feast") to the host after the meal and the restaurant staff when leaving.

=== Traditional cuisine ===
Japanese cuisine is based on combining the staple food, which is steamed white rice or gohan (御飯), with one or more okazu (おかず), "main" or "side" dishes. This may be accompanied by a clear or miso soup and tsukemono (pickles). The phrase ichijū-sansai (一汁三菜, "one soup, three sides") refers to the makeup of a typical meal served but has roots in classic kaiseki, honzen, and yūshoku cuisine. The term is also used to describe the first course served in standard kaiseki cuisine nowadays.

The origin of Japanese "one soup, three sides" cuisine is a dietary style called Ichiju-Issai (一汁一菜, "one soup, one dish"), tracing back to the Five Great Zen Temples of the 12-century Kamakura period (Kamakura Gozan), developed as a form of meal that emphasized frugality and simplicity.

Rice is served in its own small bowl (chawan), and each main course item is placed on its own small plate (sara) or bowl (hachi) for each individual portion. This is done even in Japanese homes. This contrasts with Western-style home dinners in which each individual takes helpings from large serving dishes of food placed in the middle of the dining table. Japanese style traditionally abhors different flavored dishes touching each other on a single plate, so different dishes are given their own individual plates as mentioned or are partitioned using, for example, leaves. Placing main dishes on top of rice, thereby "soiling" it, is also frowned upon by traditional etiquette.

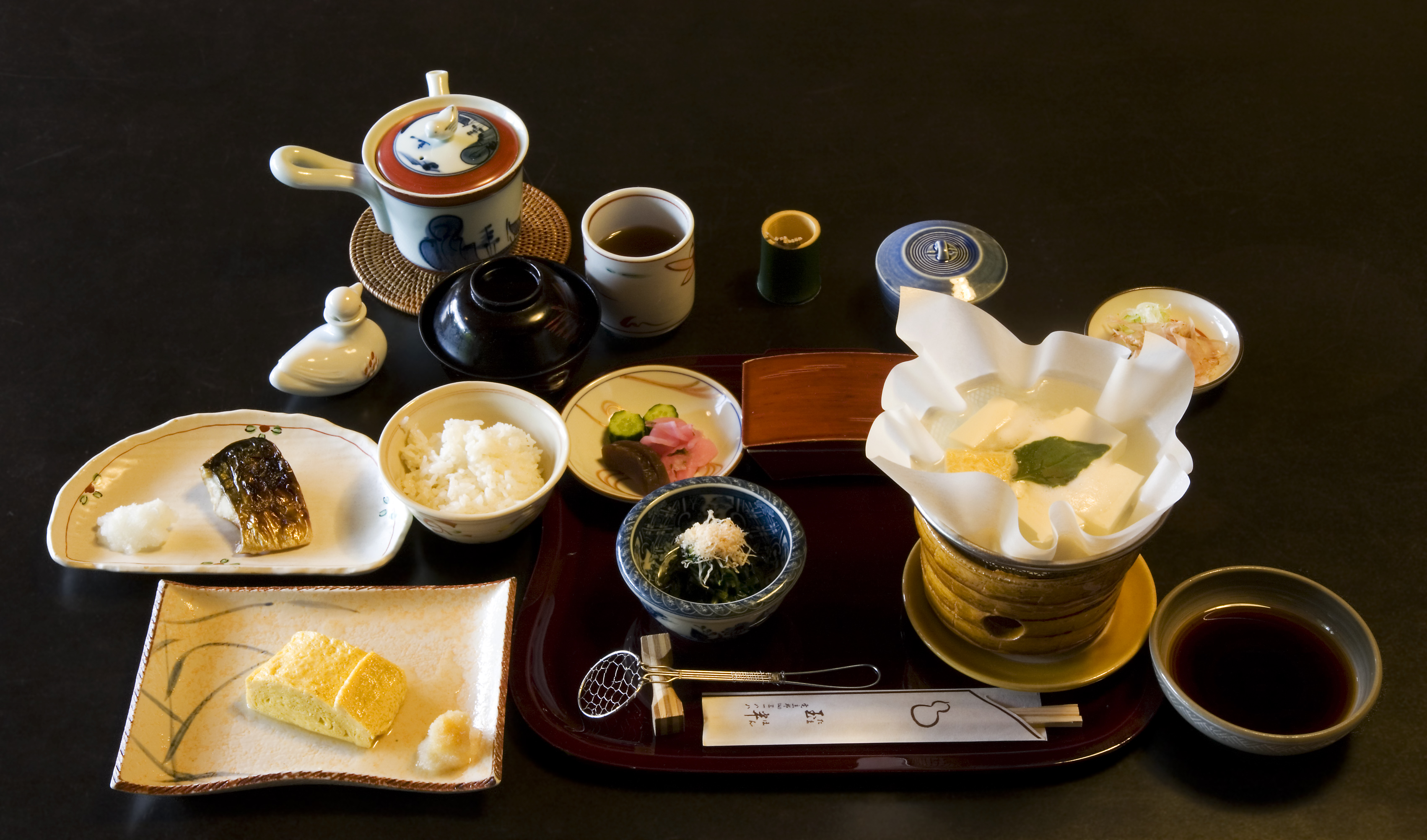
Breakfast at a ryokan (Japanese inn), featuring grilled mackerel, Kansai-style dashimaki egg, tofu in kaminabe (paper pot)

Although this tradition of not placing other foods on rice originated from classical Chinese dining formalities, especially after the adoption of Buddhist tea ceremonies; it became most popular and common during and after the Kamakura period, such as in the kaiseki (懐石). Although present-day Chinese cuisine has abandoned this practice, Japanese cuisine retains it. One exception is the popular donburi, in which toppings are directly served on rice.

The small rice bowl (茶碗, chawan), literally "tea bowl", doubles as a word for the large tea bowls in tea ceremonies. Thus in common speech, the drinking cup is referred to as yunomi-jawan or yunomi for the purpose of distinction. Among the nobility, each course of a full-course Japanese meal would be brought on serving napkins called zen (膳), which were originally platformed trays or small dining tables. In the modern age, faldstool trays or stackup-type legged trays may still be seen used in zashiki (座敷), i.e. tatami-mat rooms, for large banquets or at a ryokan type inn. Some restaurants might use the suffix -zen (膳) as a more sophisticated though dated synonym to the more familiar teishoku (定食), since the latter basically is a term for a combo meal served at a taishū-shokudō, akin to a diner. Teishoku means a meal of fixed menu (for example, grilled fish with rice and soup), a dinner à prix fixe served at shokudō (食堂, "dining hall") or ryōriten (料理店, "restaurant"), which is somewhat vague (shokudō can mean a diner-type restaurant or a corporate lunch hall); writer on Japanese popular culture Ishikawa Hiroyoshi defines it as fare served at teishoku dining halls (定食食堂, teishoku-shokudō), and comparable diner-like establishments.

=== Seasonality ===
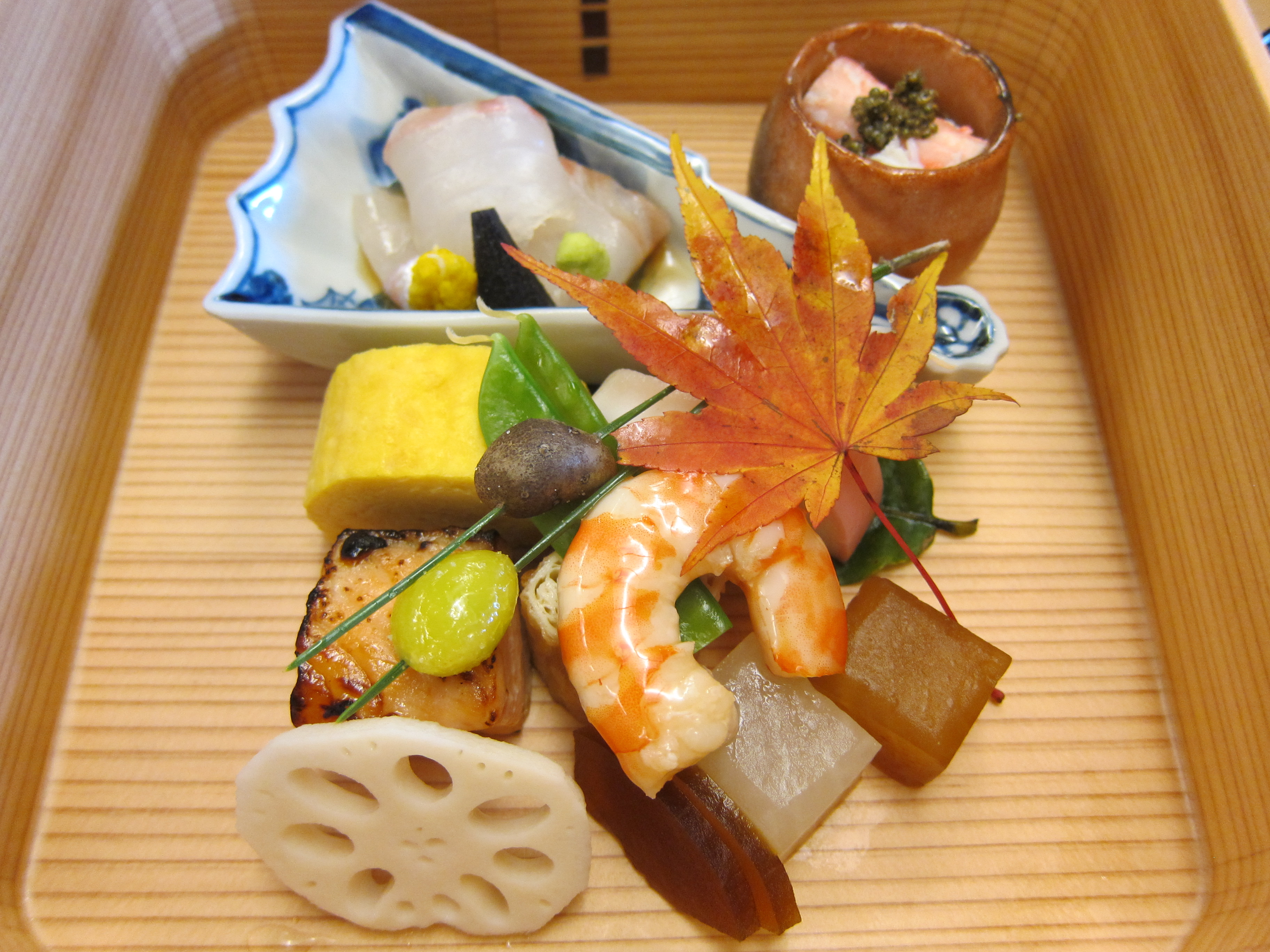
Kaiseki appetizers on a wooden plate

Emphasis is placed on seasonality of food or shun (旬), and dishes are designed to herald the arrival of the four seasons or calendar months.

Seasonality means taking advantage of the "fruit of the mountains" (山の幸, yama no sachi; alt. "bounty of the mountains") (for example, bamboo shoots in spring, chestnuts in the autumn) as well as the "fruit of the sea" (海の幸, umi no sachi; alt. "bounty of the sea") as they come into season. Thus the first catch of skipjack tunas (初鰹, hatsu-gatsuo) that arrives with the Kuroshio Current has traditionally been greatly prized.

If something becomes available rather earlier than what is usual for the item in question, the first crop or early catch is called hashiri.

Use of tree leaves and branches as decor is also characteristic of Japanese cuisine. Maple leaves are often floated on water to exude coolness or ryō (涼); sprigs of nandina are popularly used. The haran (Aspidistra) and sasa bamboo leaves were often cut into shapes and placed underneath or used as separators.

=== UNESCO recognition ===
In February 2012, the Agency for Cultural Affairs recommended that 'Washoku (和食) : Traditional Dietary Cultures of the Japanese' be added to the UNESCO Representative List of the Intangible Cultural Heritage of Humanity. On December 4, 2013, "Washoku, traditional dietary cultures [sic] of the Japanese, notably for the celebration of New Year" was added to UNESCO's Intangible Cultural Heritage, bringing the number of Japanese assets listed on UNESCO's Intangible Cultural Heritage list to 22.

== Traditional ingredients ==
A characteristic of traditional Japanese food is the sparing use of red meat, oils and fats, and dairy products. Use of ingredients such as soy sauce, miso, and umeboshi tends to result in dishes with high salt content, though there are low-sodium versions of these available.

=== Meat consumption ===
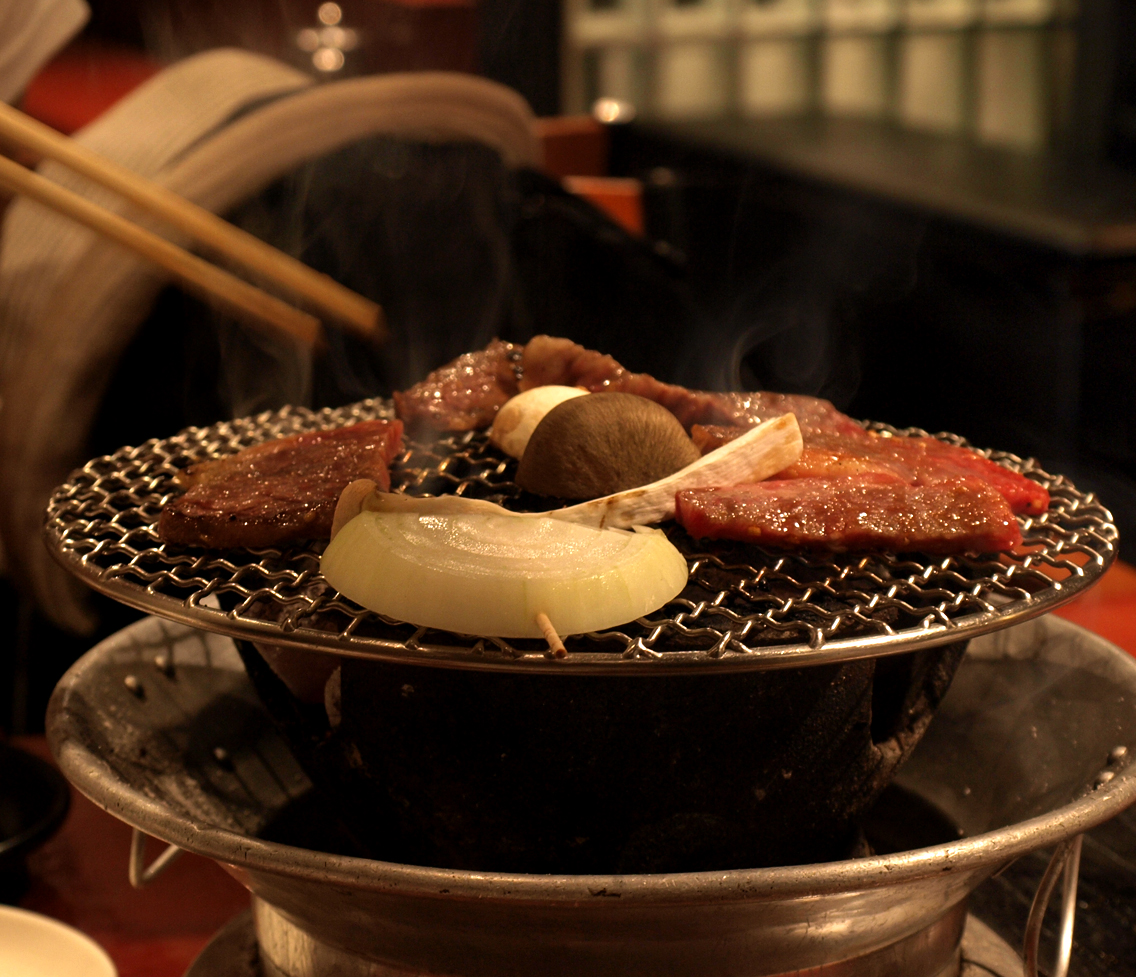
Yakiniku

As Japan is an island nation surrounded by an ocean, its people have always taken advantage of the abundant seafood supply. It is the opinion of some food scholars that the Japanese diet always relied mainly on "grains with vegetables or seaweeds as main, with poultry secondary, and red meat in slight amounts" even before the advent of Buddhism which placed an even stronger taboo. The eating of "four-legged creatures" (四足, yotsuashi) was spoken of as taboo, unclean or something to be avoided by personal choice through the Edo period. The consumption of whale and terrapin meat were not forbidden under this definition. Despite this, the consumption of red meat did not completely disappear in Japan. Eating wild game—as opposed to domesticated livestock—was tolerated; in particular, trapped hare was counted using the measure word wa (羽), a term normally reserved for birds.

Beef hot pot being made at a party in Japan

In 1872 of the Meiji restoration, as part of the opening up of Japan to Western influence, Emperor Meiji lifted the ban on the consumption of red meat. The removal of the ban encountered resistance and in one notable response, ten monks attempted to break into the Imperial Palace. The monks asserted that due to foreign influence, large numbers of Japanese had begun eating meat and that this was "destroying the soul of the Japanese people." Several of the monks were killed during the break-in attempt, and the remainder were arrested. On the other hand, the consumption of meat was accepted by the common people. Gyūnabe (牛鍋, beef hot pot), the prototype of sukiyaki, became the rage of the time. Western restaurants moved in, and some of them changed their form to Yōshoku (洋食, western foods).

Vegetable consumption has dwindled while processed foods have become more prominent in Japanese households due to the rising costs of general foodstuffs. Nonetheless, Kyoto vegetables, or Kyoyasai, are rising in popularity and different varieties of Kyoto vegetables are being revived.

=== Cooking oil ===
Generally speaking, traditional Japanese cuisine is prepared with little cooking oil. A major exception is the deep-frying of foods. This cooking method was introduced during the Edo period due to influence from Western (formerly called nanban-ryōri (南蛮料理)) and Chinese cuisine, and became commonplace with the availability of cooking oil due to increased productivity. Dishes such as tempura, aburaage, and satsuma age are now part of established traditional Japanese cuisine. Words such as tempura or hiryōzu (synonymous with ganmodoki) are said to be of Portuguese origin.

Also, certain rustic sorts of traditional Japanese foods such as kinpira, hijiki, and kiriboshi daikon usually involve stir-frying in oil before stewing in soy sauce. Some standard osōzai or obanzai dishes feature stir-fried Japanese greens with either age or chirimen-jako, dried sardines.

=== Seasonings ===
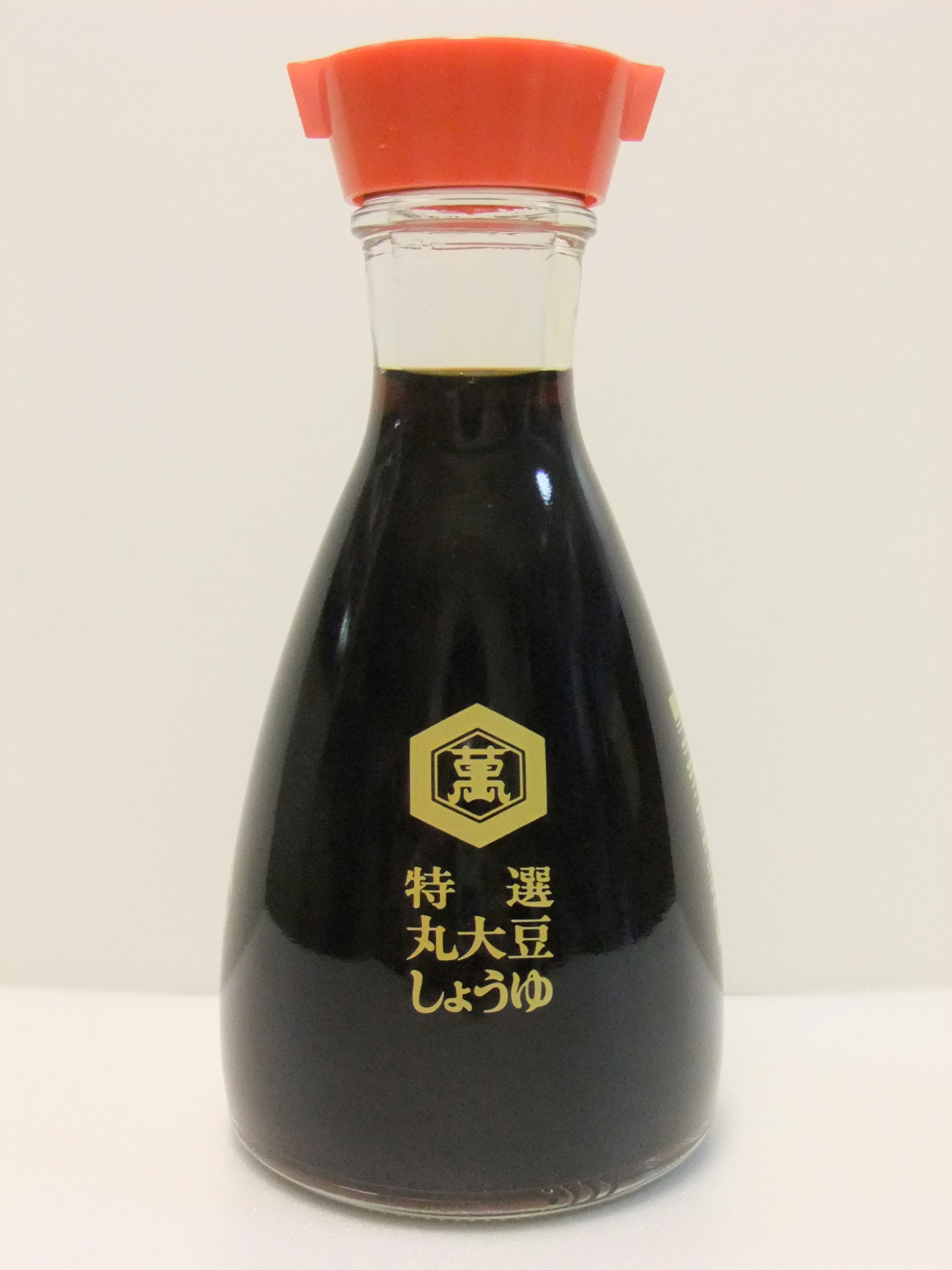
The use of soy sauce is prevalent in Japanese cuisine.

Traditional Japanese food is typically seasoned with a combination of dashi, soy sauce, sake and mirin, vinegar, sugar, and salt. A modest number of herbs and spices may be used during cooking as a hint or accent, or as a means of neutralizing fishy or gamy odors present. Examples of such spices include ginger, perilla and takanotsume (鷹の爪) red pepper.

Intense condiments, such as wasabi or Japanese mustard, are provided as condiments to raw fish, due to their effect on the mucous membrane which paralyze the sense of smell, particularly from fish odors. A sprig of mitsuba or a piece of yuzu rind floated on soups are called ukimi. Minced shiso leaves and myoga often serve as yakumi, a type of condiment paired with tataki of katsuo or soba. Shichimi is also a very popular spice mixture often added to soups, noodles and rice cakes. Shichimi is a chilli-based spice mix which contains seven spices: chilli, sansho, orange peel, black sesame, white sesame, hemp, ginger, and nori.

=== Garnishes ===
Once a main dish has been cooked, spices such as minced ginger and various pungent herbs may be added as a garnish, called tsuma. Finally, a dish may be garnished with minced seaweed in the form of crumpled nori or flakes of aonori.

Inedible garnishes are featured in dishes to reflect a holiday or the season. Generally these include inedible leaves, flowers native to Japan or with a long history of being grown in the country, as well as their artificial counterparts.

=== Salads ===
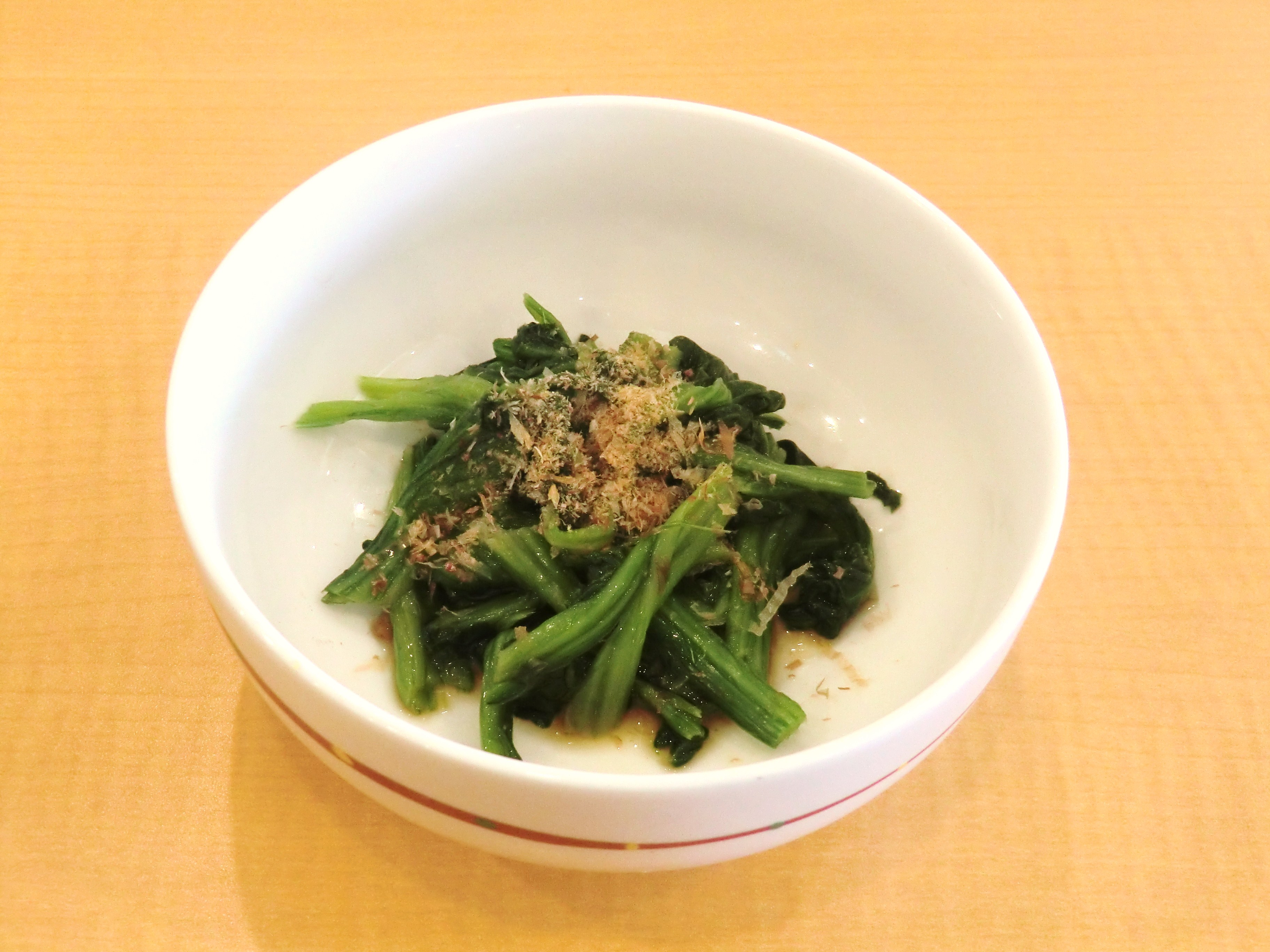
Japanese boiled spinach salad (ohitashi)

The o-hitashi or hitashi-mono (おひたし) is boiled green-leaf vegetables bunched and cut to size, steeped in dashi broth, eaten with dashes of soy sauce. Another item is sunomono (酢の物; "vinegar item"), which could be made with wakame seaweed, or be something like a kōhaku namasu (紅白なます; "red white namasu") made from thin toothpick slices of daikon and carrot. The so-called vinegar that is blended with the ingredient here is often sanbaizu (三杯酢; "three cupful/spoonful vinegar") which is a blend of vinegar, mirin, and soy sauce. A tosazu (土佐酢; "Tosa vinegar") adds katsuo dashi to this.

An aemono (和え物) is another group of items, describable as a sort of "tossed salad" or "dressed" (though aemono also includes thin strips of squid or fish sashimi (itozukuri) etc. similarly prepared). One type is goma-ae (胡麻和え) where usually vegetables such as green beans are tossed with white or black sesame seeds ground in a suribachi mortar bowl, flavored additionally with sugar and soy sauce. Shira-ae (白和え) adds tofu (bean curd) in the mix. An aemono is tossed with vinegar-white miso mix and uses wakegi scallion and baka-gai (バカガイ / 馬鹿貝; a trough shell, Mactra chinensis) as standard.

=== Eggs ===
Japanese egg dishes include tamagoyaki, onsen tamago, tamago-dōfu (jp) and chawanmushi. Datemaki is eaten during the New Year holidays.

Well-known rice dishes with eggs include oyakodon, omurice and tamago kake gohan that is simply raw egg on rice.

=== Rice ===
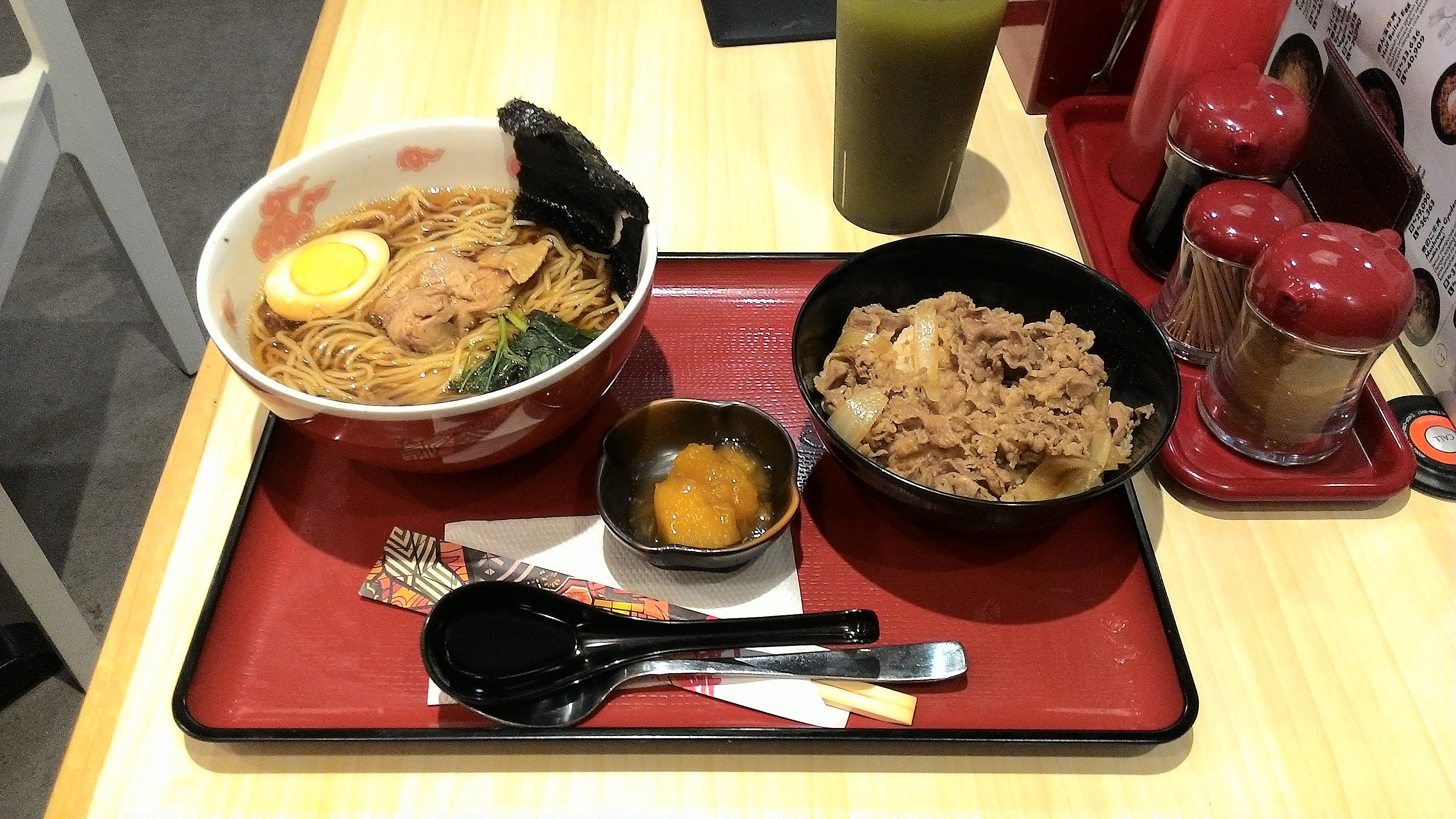
Gyūdon beef rice bowl (right) and niku shoyu ramen beef noodle (left)

Rice has historically been the staple food of the Japanese people. Its fundamental importance is evident from the fact that the word for cooked rice, gohan or meshi, also stands for a "meal". While rice has an ancient history of cultivation in Japan, its use as a staple has not been universal. Notably, in northern areas (northern Honshū and Hokkaidō), other grains such as wheat were more common into the 19th century.

In most of Japan, rice used to be consumed for almost every meal, and although a 2007 survey showed that 70% of Japanese still eat it once or twice a day, its popularity is now declining. In the 20th century there has been a shift in dietary habits, with an increasing number of people choosing wheat-based products (such as bread and noodles) over rice.

Japanese rice is short-grained and becomes sticky when cooked. Most rice is sold as hakumai (白米, "white rice"), with the outer portion of the grains (糠, nuka) polished away. Unpolished brown rice (玄米, genmai) is considered less desirable, but its popularity has been increasing.

=== Noodles ===
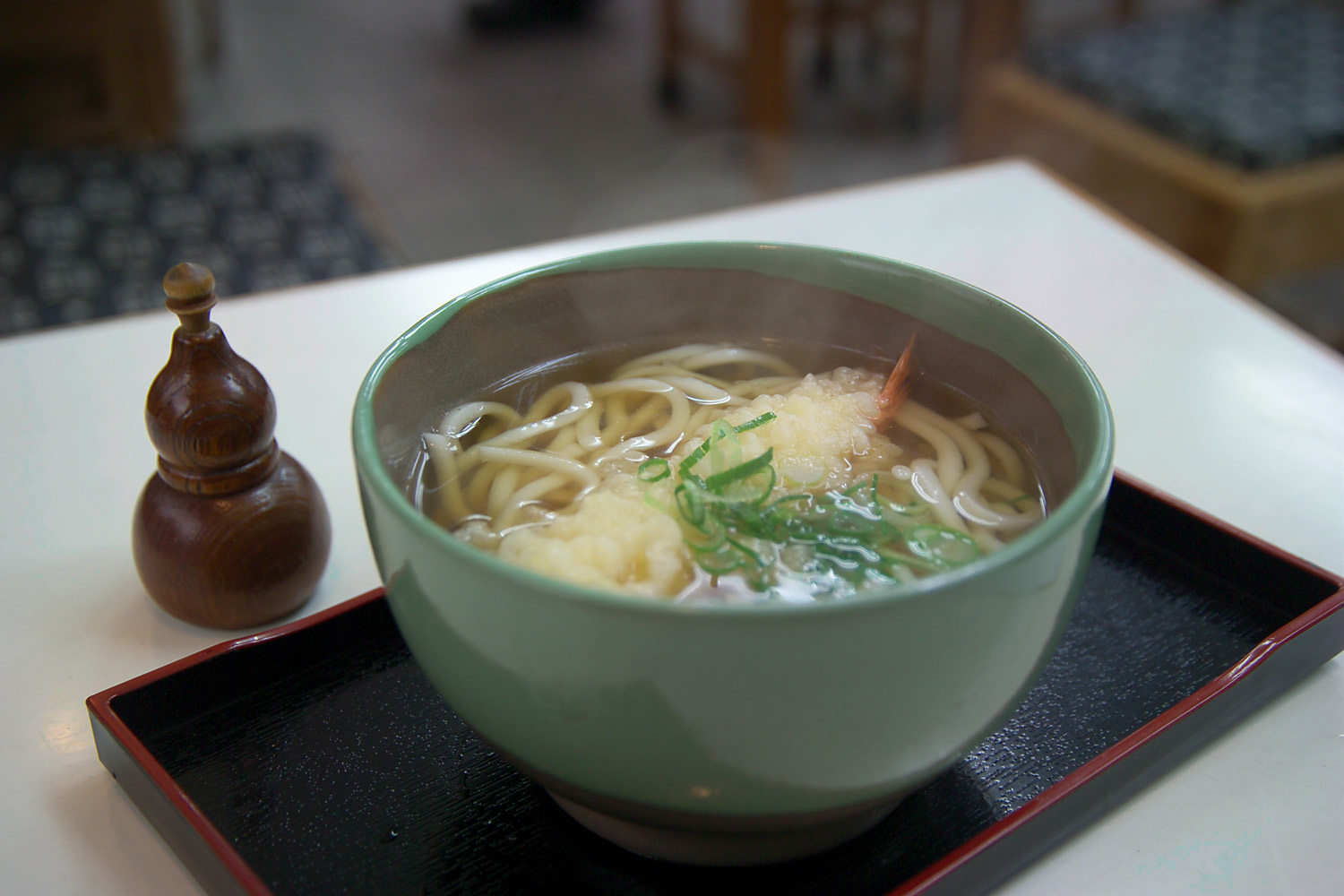
Udon noodles

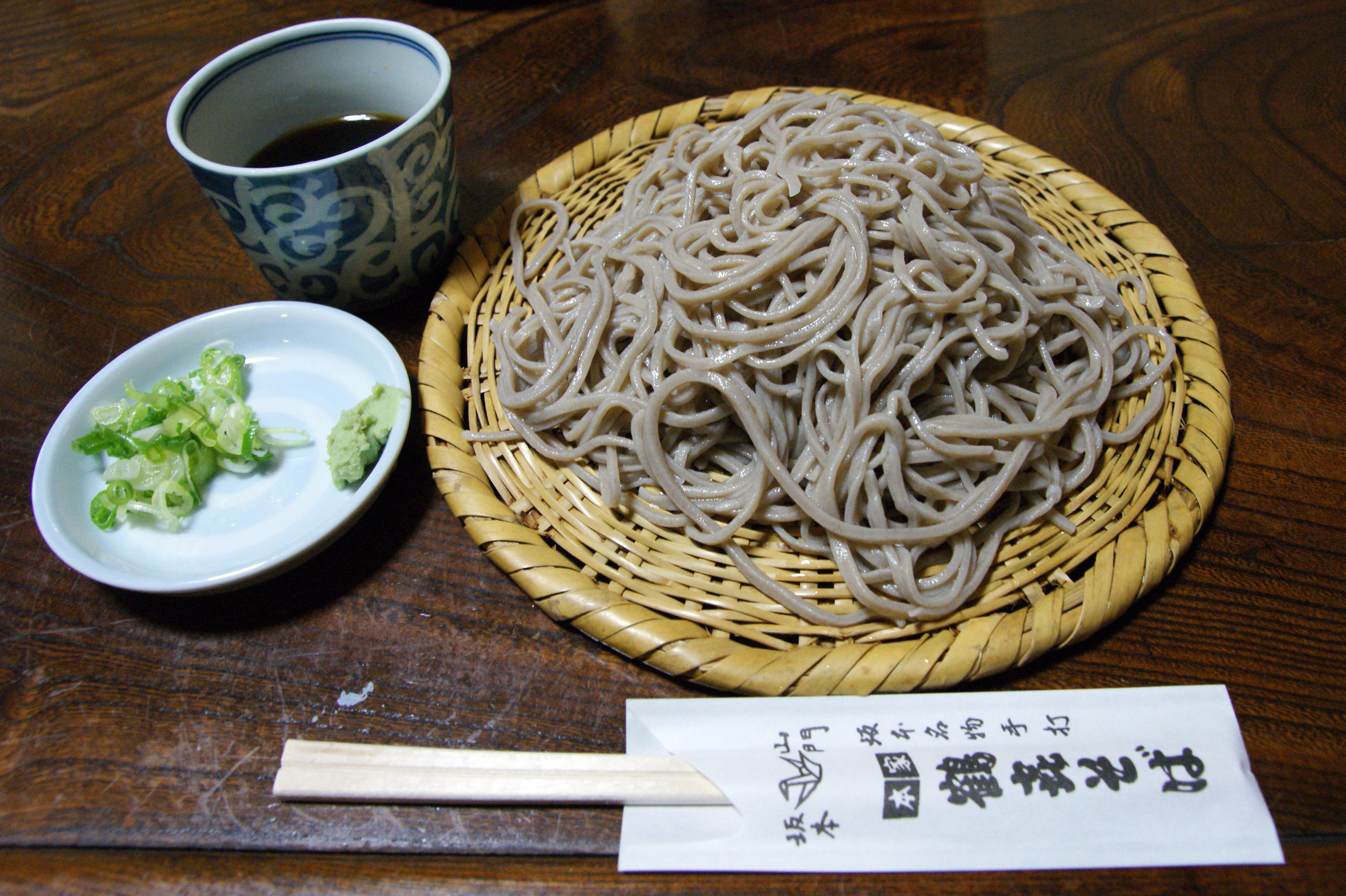
Soba noodles

Japanese noodles often substitute for a rice-based meal. Soba (thin, grayish-brown noodles containing buckwheat flour) and udon (thick wheat noodles) are the main traditional noodles, while ramen is a modern import and now very popular. There are also other, common noodles, such as somen (thin, white noodles containing wheat flour). Cold somen noodles are often eaten during the hot summer. Hiyashi chūka are also popular noodles in the summer.

Japanese noodles, such as soba and udon, are eaten as a standalone, and usually not with a side dish, in terms of general custom. It may have toppings, but they are called gu (具). The fried battered shrimp tempura sitting in a bowl of tempura-soba would be referred to as "the shrimp" or "the tempura", and not so much be referred to as a topping (gu). The identical toppings, if served as a dish to be eaten with plain white rice could be called okazu, so these terms are context-sensitive. Some noodle dishes derive their name from Japanese folklore, such as kitsune and tanuki, reflecting dishes in which the noodles can be changed, but the broth and garnishes correspond to their respective legend.

Hot noodles are usually served in a bowl already steeped in their broth and are called kakesoba or kakeudon. Cold soba arrive unseasoned and heaped atop a zaru or seiro, and are picked up with a chopstick and dunked in their dipping sauce. The broth can consist of many ingredients but is generally based on dashi; the sauce, called tsuyu, is usually more concentrated and made from soy sauce, dashi and mirin, sake or both.

In the simple form, yakumi (薬味, condiments and spices) such as shichimi, nori, finely chopped scallions, wasabi, etc. are added to the noodles, besides the broth/dip sauce.

Udon may also be eaten in kama-age style, piping hot straight out of the boiling pot, and eaten with plain soy sauce and sometimes with raw egg also.

Japanese noodles are traditionally eaten by bringing the bowl close to the mouth, and sucking in the noodles with the aid of chopsticks. The resulting loud slurping noise is considered normal in Japan, although in the 2010s concerns began to be voiced about the slurping being offensive to others, especially tourists. The word nuuhara (ヌーハラ, from "nuudoru harasumento", noodle harassment) was coined to describe this.

=== Sweets ===
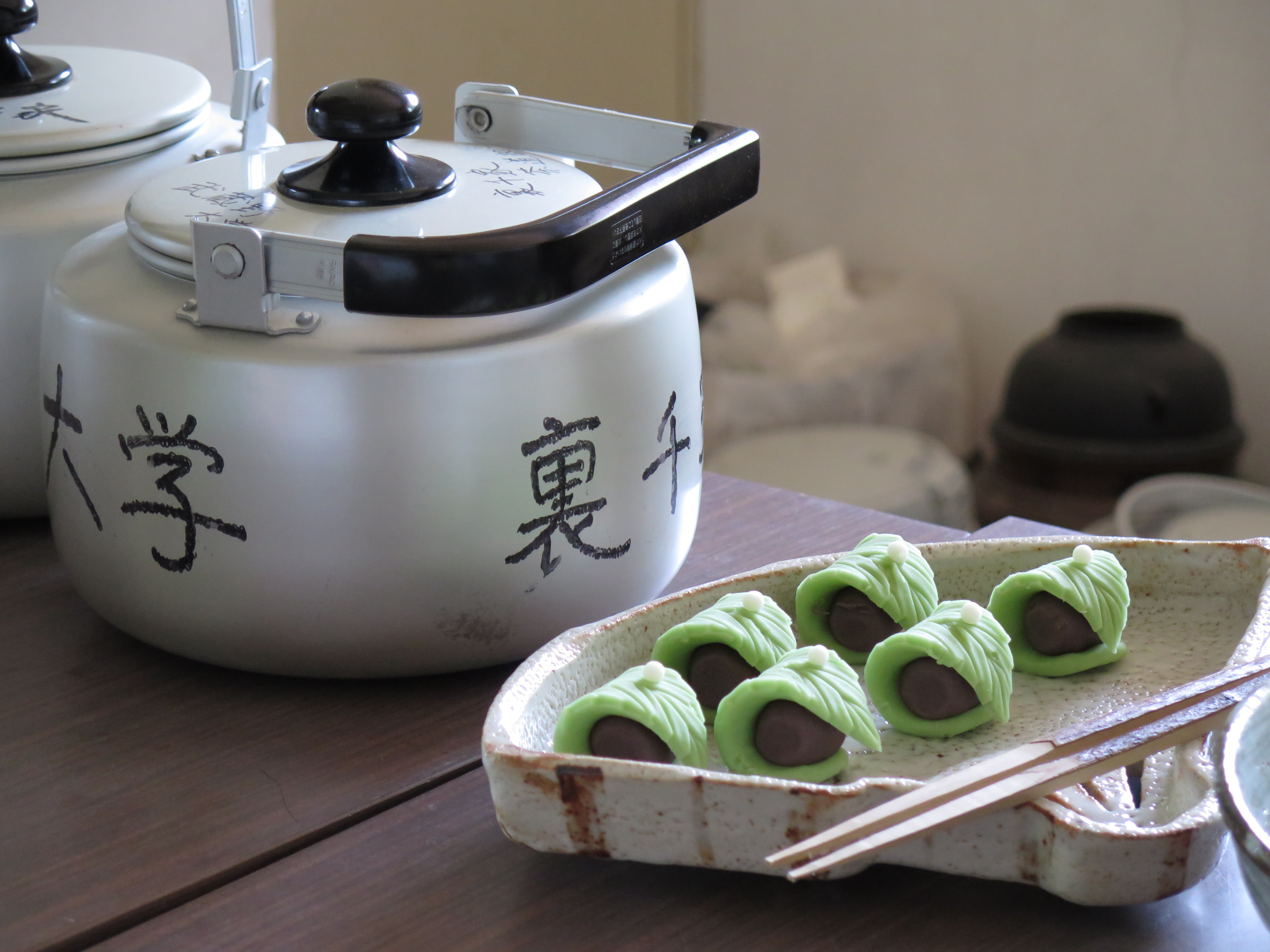
Green wagashi

Traditional Japanese sweets are known as wagashi. Ingredients such as red bean paste and mochi are used. More modern-day tastes includes green tea ice cream, a very popular flavor. Almost all manufacturers produce a version of it. Kakigōri (かき氷) is a shaved ice dessert flavored with syrup or condensed milk. It is usually sold and eaten at summer festivals. A dessert very popular amongst children in Japan is dorayaki. They are sweet pancakes filled with a sweet red bean paste. They are mostly eaten at room temperature but are also considered very delicious hot. Similar sweets to dorayaki include imagawayaki and fish-shaped taiyaki. Sweet breads containing red bean paste, such as anpan and an-doughnut, are also commonly eaten.

== Drinks ==
=== Tea ===
Green tea may be served with most Japanese dishes. It is produced in Japan and prepared in various forms, such as matcha, the tea used in the Japanese tea ceremony. Barley tea is a favorite drink during the hot summertime.

=== Soft drink ===
Japan has a vibrant soft drink culture, with local flavors like ramune, melon soda, canned coffee, Calpis, and Pocari Sweat. Imported drinks can garner unique meanings in Japan. One example is Dr Pepper, as it has gained the reputation of an "intellectual beverage" thanks to the anime Steins;Gate. Another imported drink, such as A&W Root Beer, has a strong ice cream float presence in the tropical areas of Okinawa, which gives the drink an association with beach vacations.

=== Beer ===
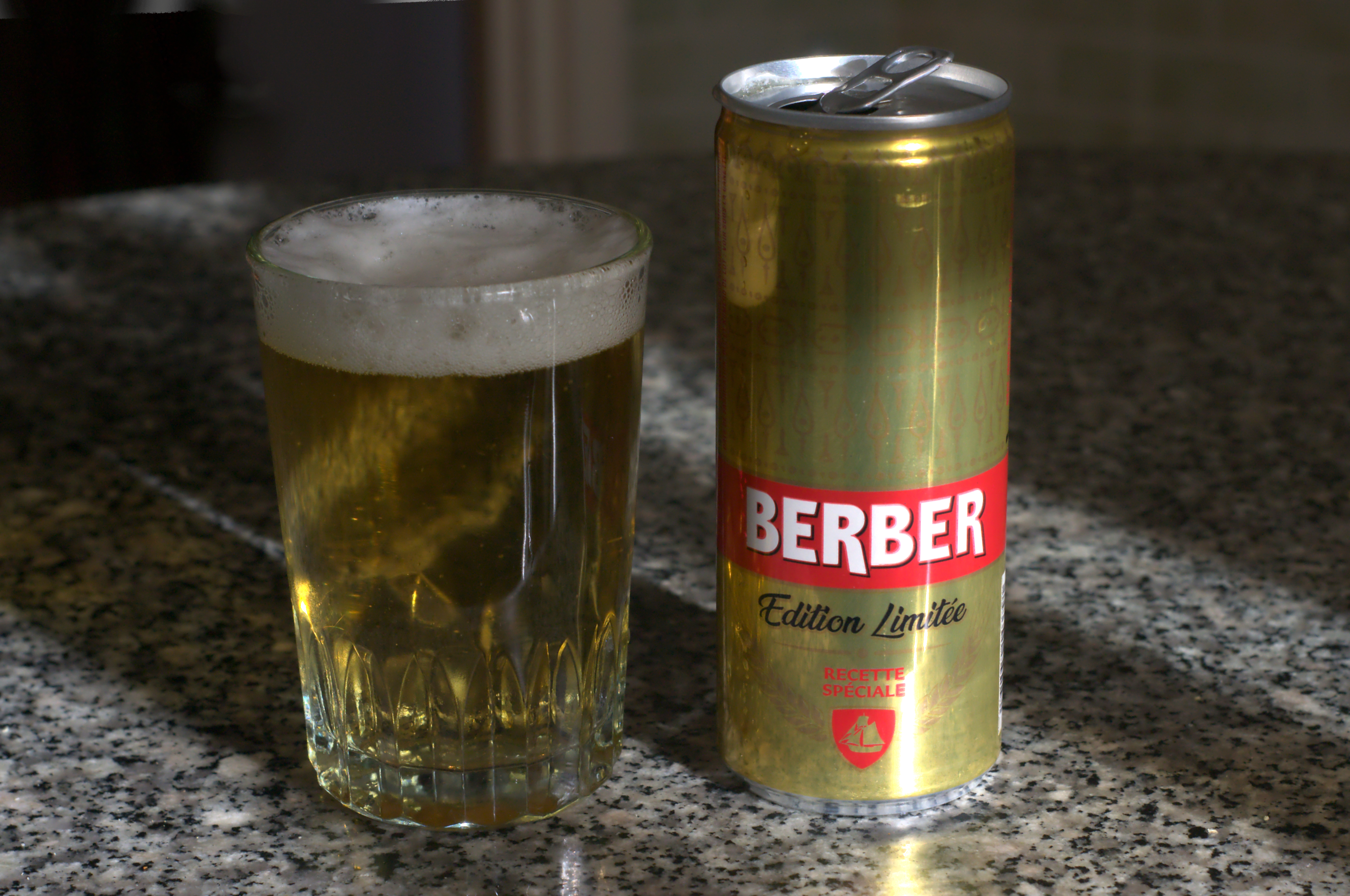
Lager

Beer production started in Japan in the 1860s. The most commonly consumed beers in Japan are pale-coloured light lagers, with an alcohol strength of around 5.0% ABV. Lager beers are the most commonly produced beer style in Japan, but beer-like beverages, made with lower levels of malts called Happoshu (発泡酒, literally, "bubbly alcohol") or non-malt Happousei (発泡性, literally "effervescence") have captured a large part of the market as tax is substantially lower on these products. Beer and its varieties have a market share of almost 2/3 of alcoholic beverages.

Small local microbreweries have also gained increasing popularity since the 1990s, supplying distinct tasting beers in a variety of styles that seek to match the emphasis on craftsmanship, quality, and ingredient provenance often associated with Japanese food.

=== Sake ===
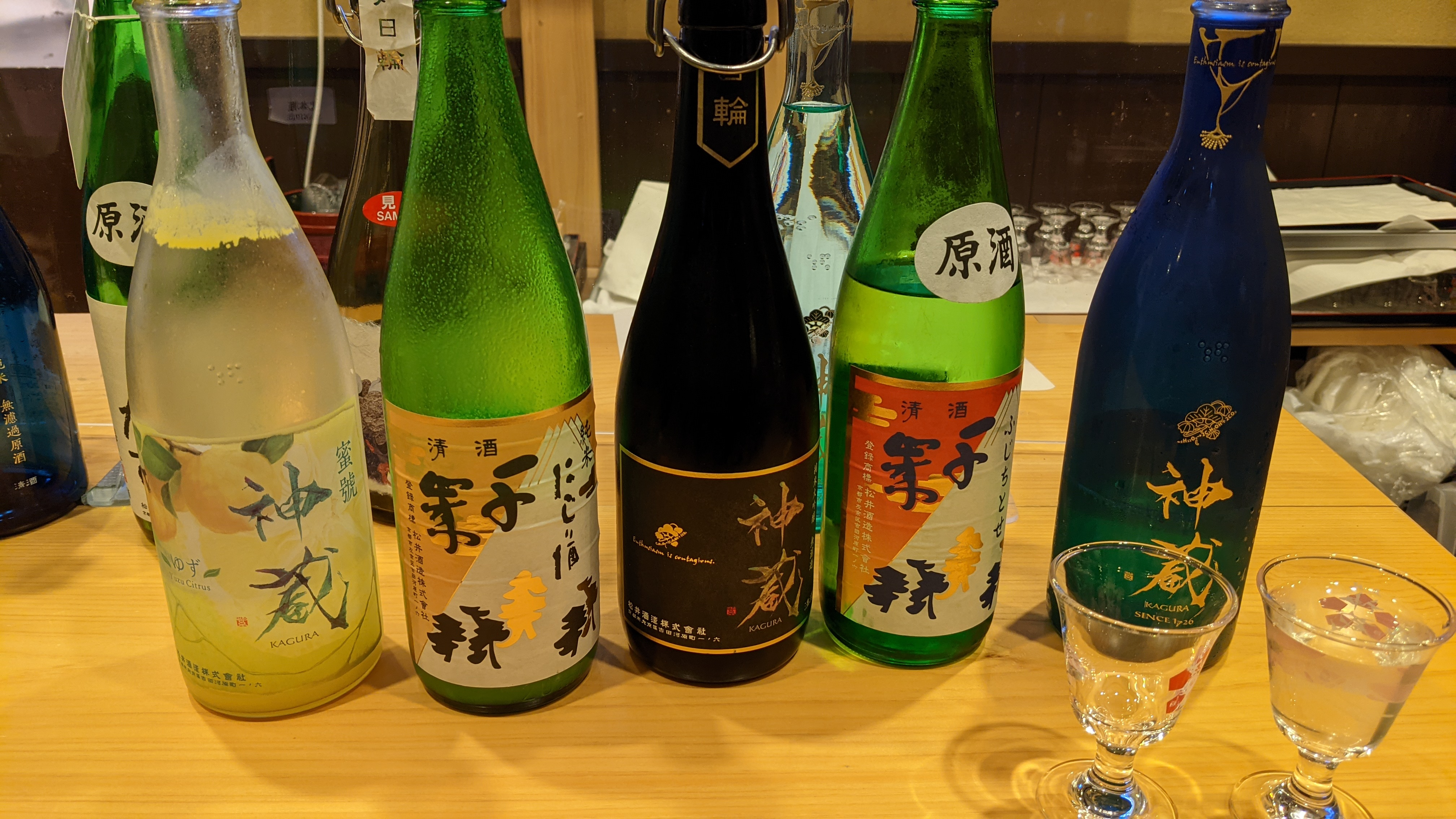
Sake

Sake is a brewed rice beverage that typically contains 15–17% alcohol and is made by multiple fermentation of rice. At traditional formal meals, it is considered an equivalent to rice and is not simultaneously taken with other rice-based dishes, although this notion is typically no longer applied to modern, refined, premium ("ginjo") sake, which bear little resemblance to the sakes of even 100 years ago. Side dishes for sake are particularly called sakana or otsumami.

Sake is brewed in a highly labor-intensive process more similar to beer production than winemaking, hence, the common description of sake as rice "wine" is misleading. Sake is made with, by legal definition, strictly just four ingredients: special rice, water, koji, and special yeast.

As of 2014, Japan had some 1500 registered breweries, which produce thousands of different sakes. Sake characteristics and flavor profiles vary with regionality, ingredients, and the styles (maintained by brewmaster guilds) that brewery leaders want to produce.

Sake flavor profiles lend extremely well to pairing with a wide variety of cuisines, including non-Japanese cuisines.

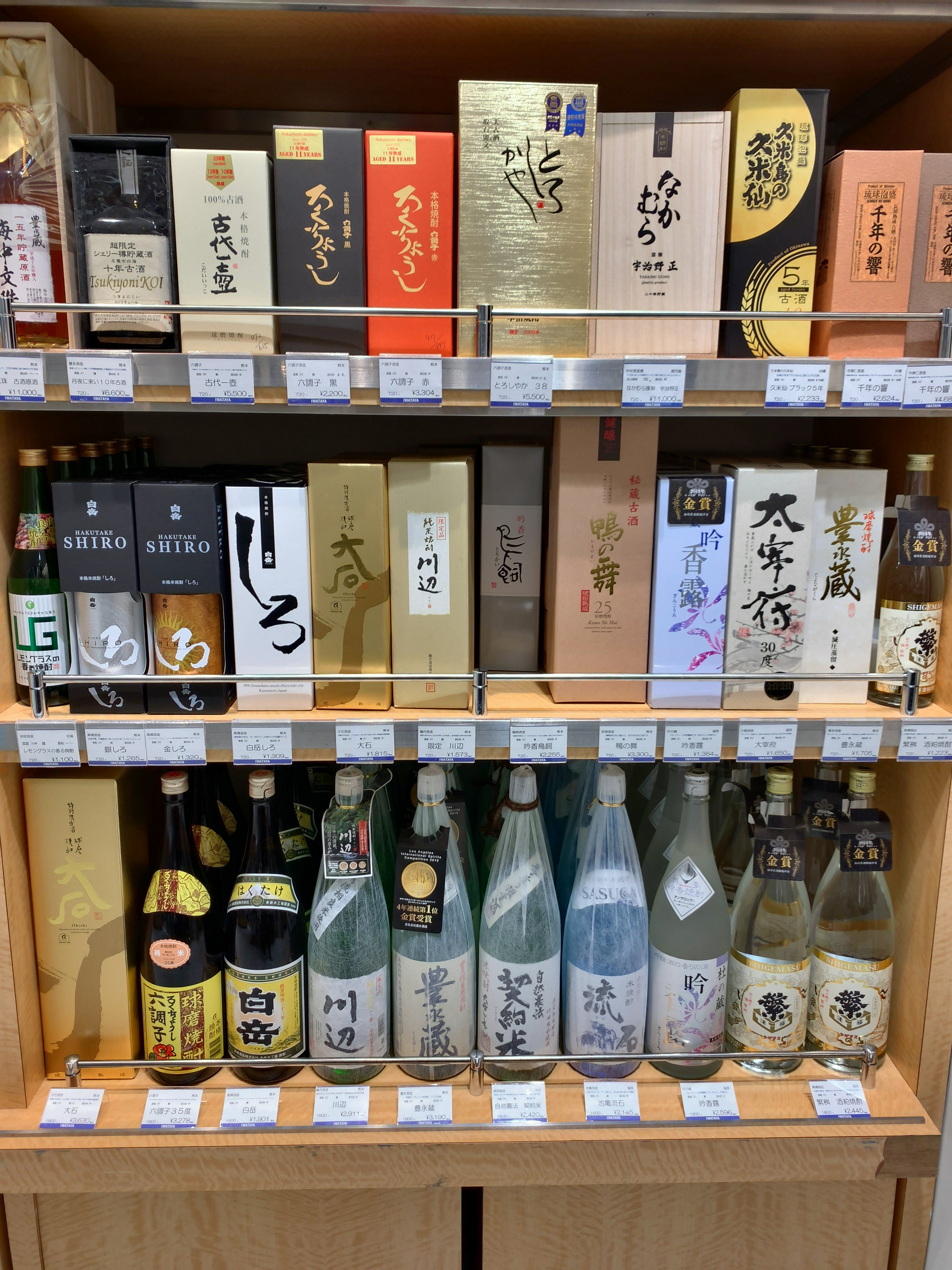
Shochu

=== Shōchū ===
Shōchū is a distilled spirit that is typically made from barley, sweet potato, buckwheat, or rice. Shōchū is produced everywhere in Japan, but its production started in Kyushu.

=== Whisky ===
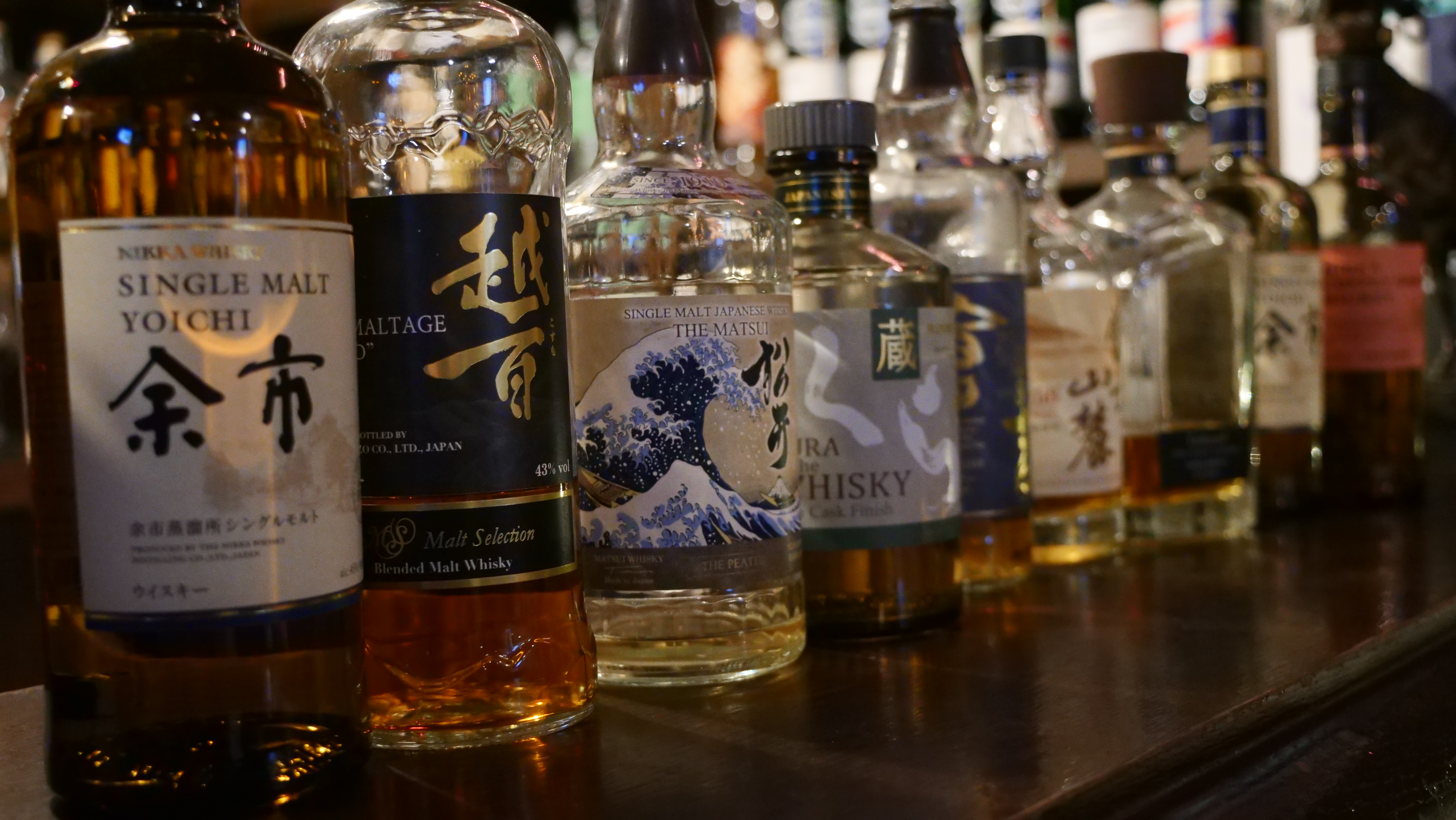
Japanese whisky

Japanese whisky began commercial production in the early 20th century, and is now extremely popular, primarily consumed in highballs (ハイボール, haibōru). It is produced in the Scottish style, with malt whisky produced since the 1980s, and has won top international awards since the 2000s.

=== Wine ===
A domestic wine production has existed since the 1860s, yet most wine is imported. The total market share of wine on alcoholic beverages is about 3%.

== Specialty food ==
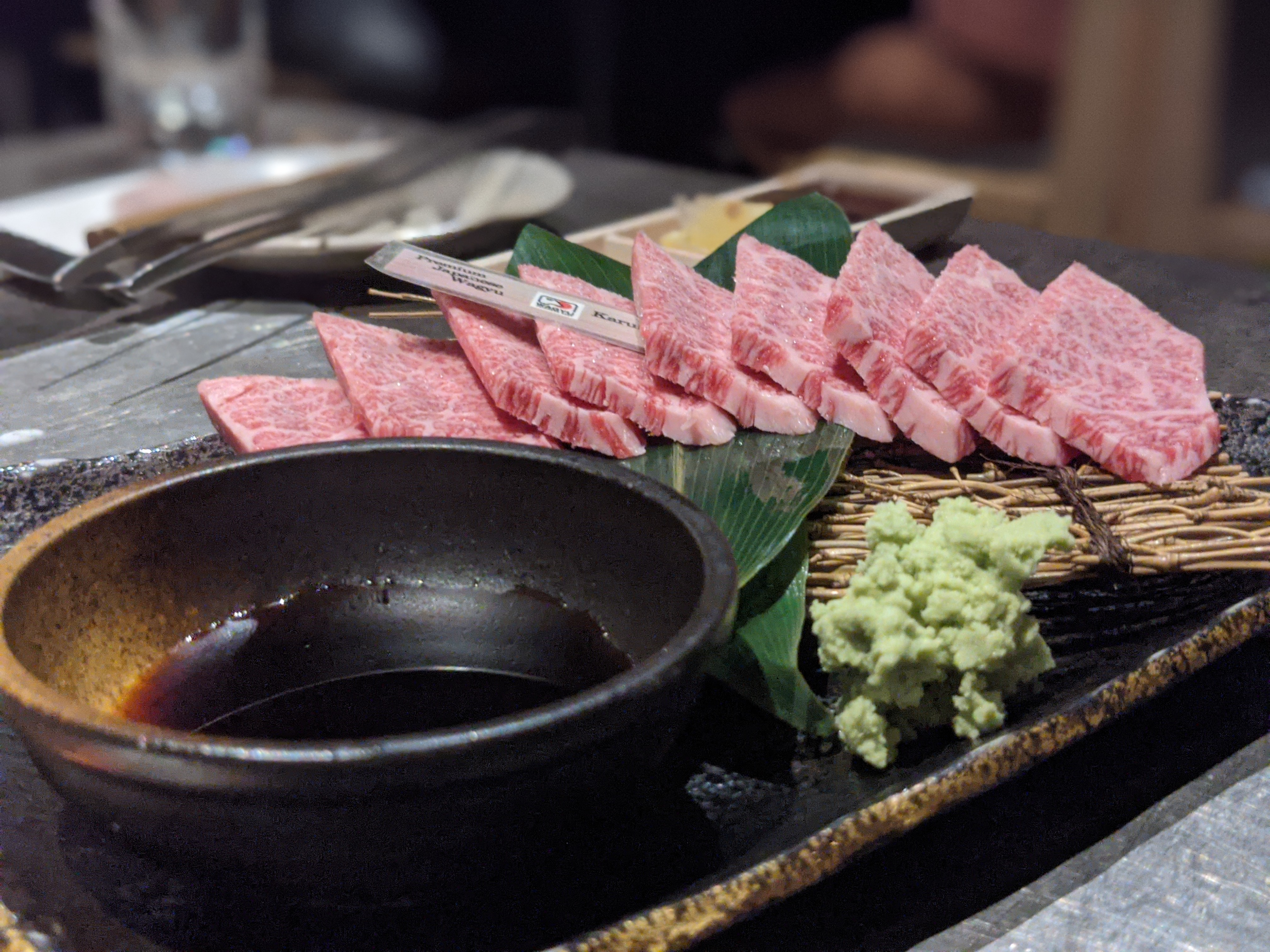
Wagyū

Wagyu is the collective name for the four principal Japanese breeds of beef cattle. All wagyū cattle derive from cross-breeding in the early twentieth century of native Japanese cattle with imported stock, mostly from Europe. In several areas of Japan, Wagyu beef is shipped carrying area names. Some examples are Matsusaka beef, Kobe beef, Yonezawa beef, Ōmi beef, and Sanda beef. In recent years, Wagyu beef has increased in fat percentage due to a decrease in grazing and an increase in using feed, resulting in larger, fattier cattle.

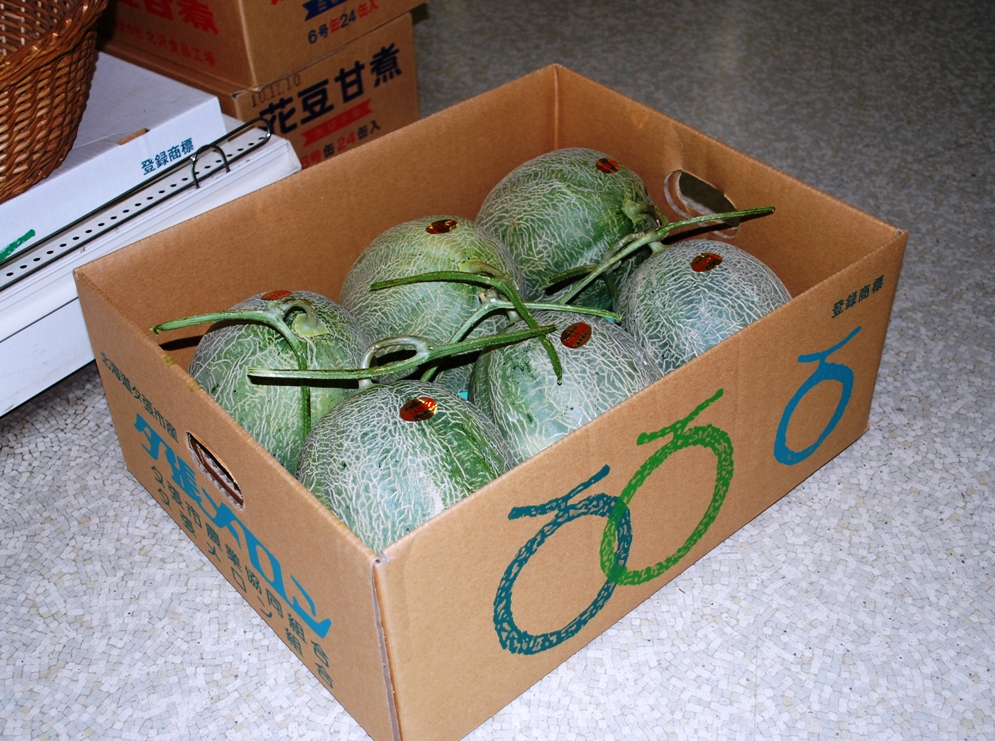
Yubari

Specialty eggs—compared to ordinary eggs, eggs produced with special feed and poultry-raising.

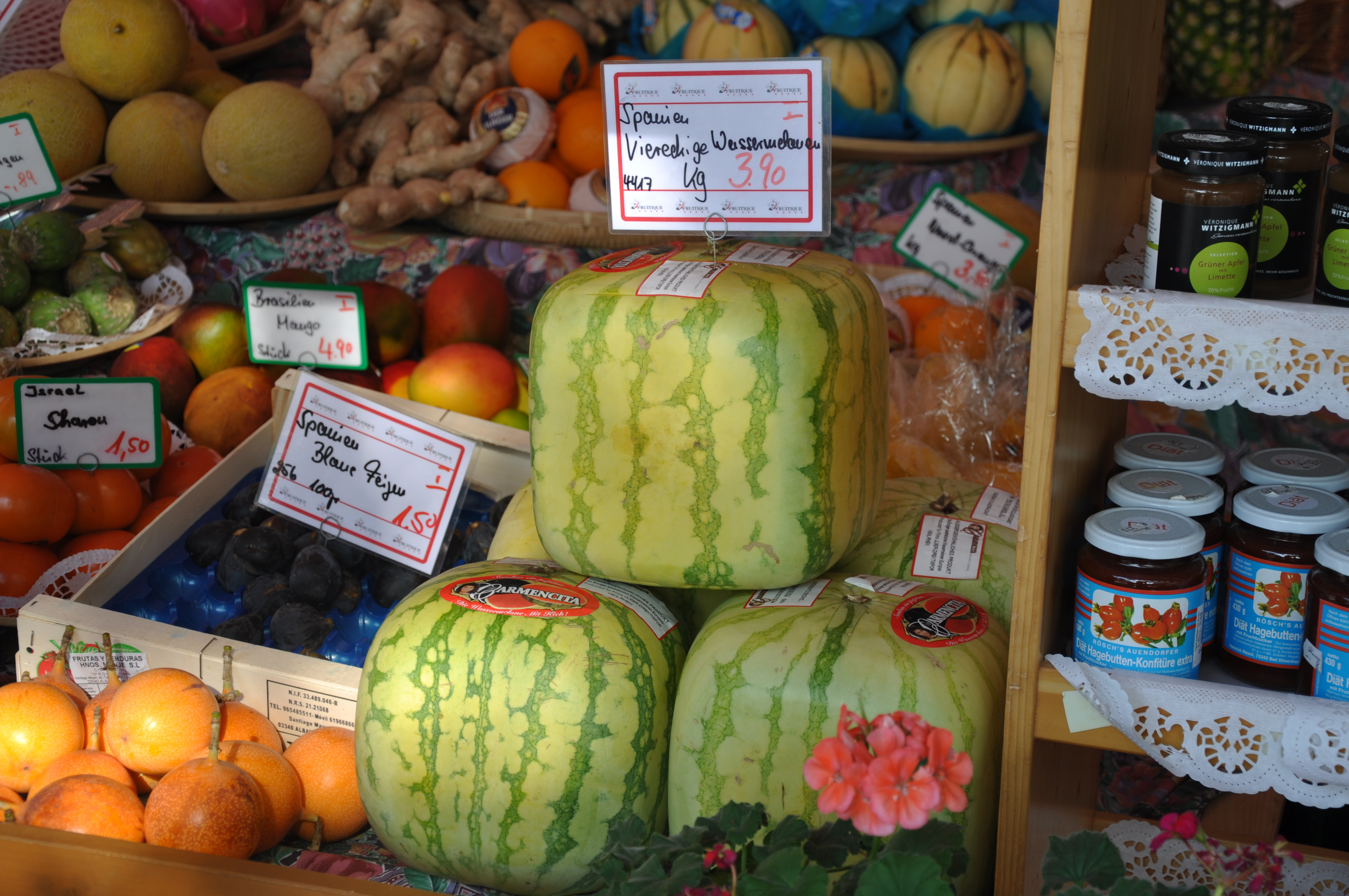
Cube watermelons

The Yubari King (夕張メロン, Yūbari Meron; Yūbari melon) is a cantaloupe cultivar farmed in greenhouses in Yūbari, Hokkaido, a small city close to Sapporo.

Square or cube watermelons are watermelons grown into the shape of a cube. Cube watermelons are commonly sold in Japan, where they are essentially ornamental and are often very expensive, with prices as high as US$200.

== Cooking techniques ==
Different cooking techniques are applied to each of the three okazu; they may be raw (sashimi), grilled, simmered (sometimes called boiled), steamed, deep-fried, vinegared, or dressed.

== Dishes ==
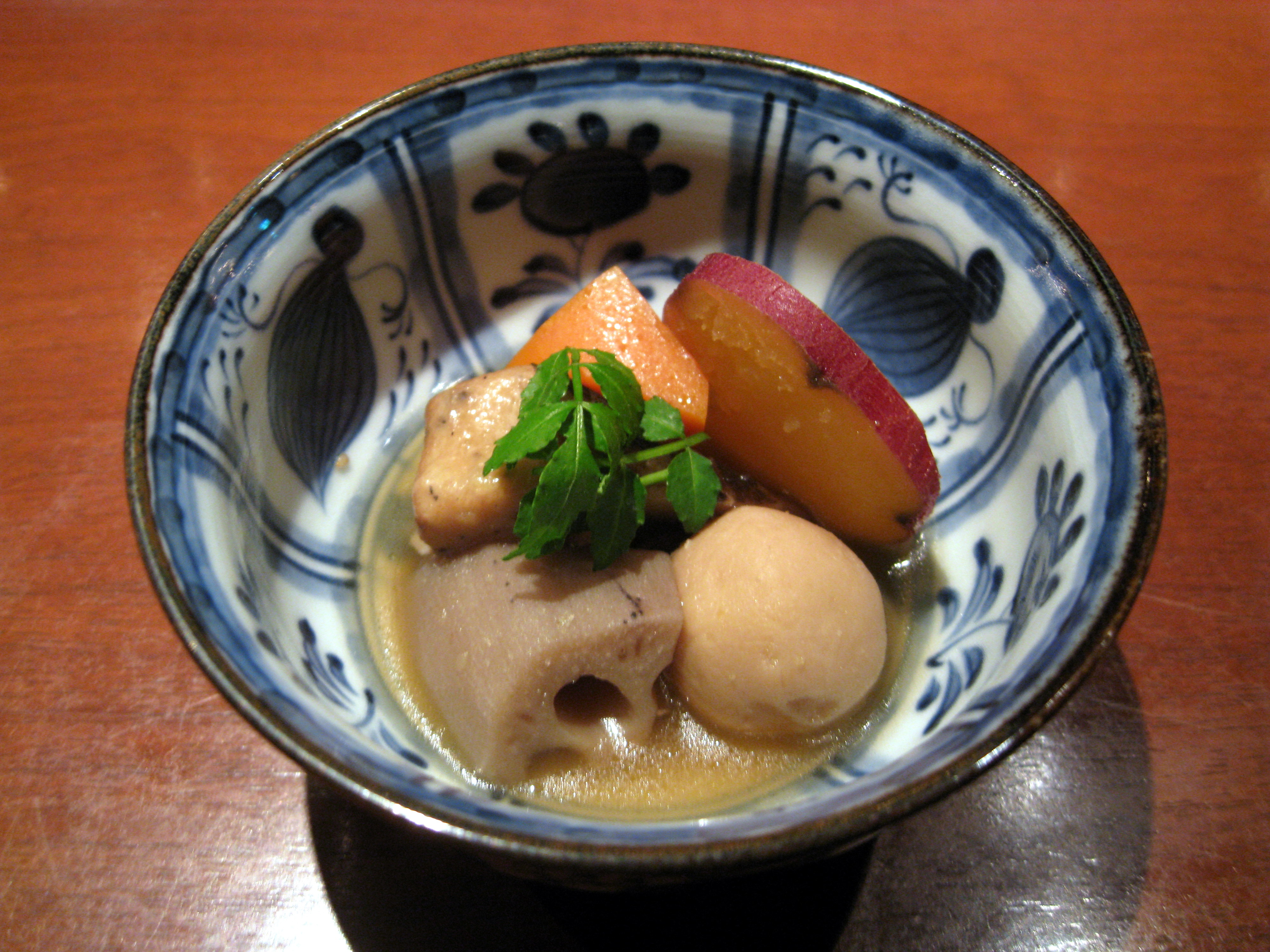
Obanzai yasai

In ichijū-sansai (一汁三菜, "one soup, three sides"), the word sai (菜) has the basic meaning of "vegetable", but secondarily means any accompanying dish (whether it uses fish or meat), with the more familiar combined form sōzai (惣菜), which is a term for any side dish, such as the vast selections sold at Japanese supermarkets or depachikas.

It figures in the Japanese word for appetizer, zensai (前菜); main dish, shusai (主菜); or sōzai (惣菜) (formal synonym for okazu), but the latter is considered somewhat of a ladies' term or nyōbō kotoba.

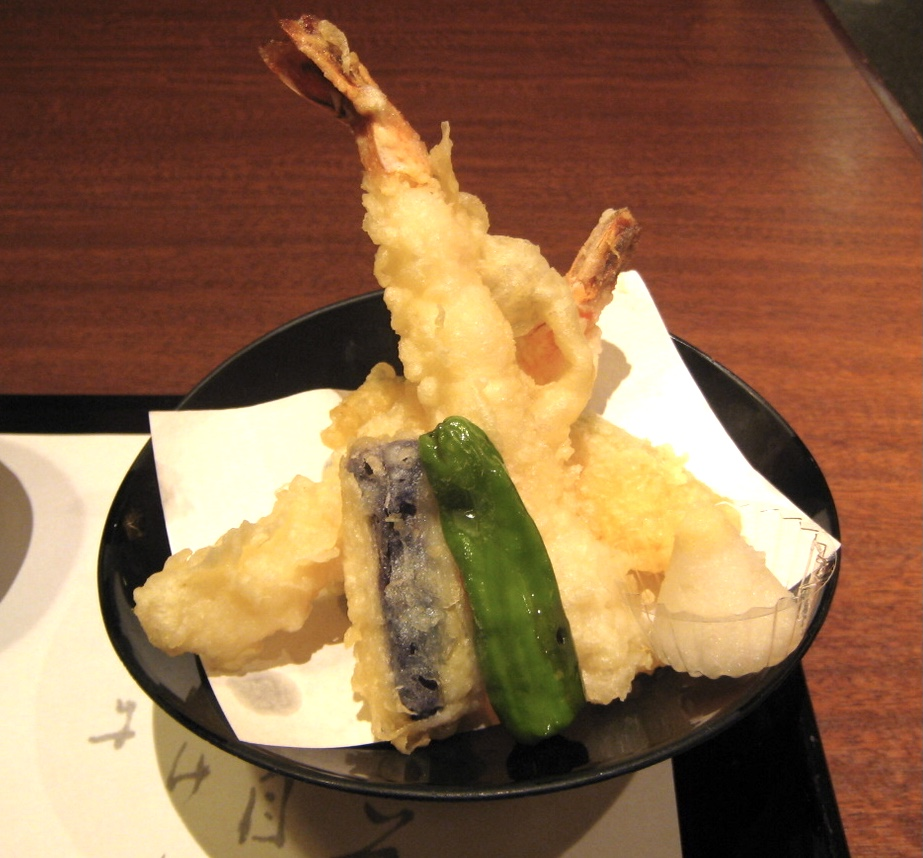
Tempura battered and deep fried seafood and vegetables

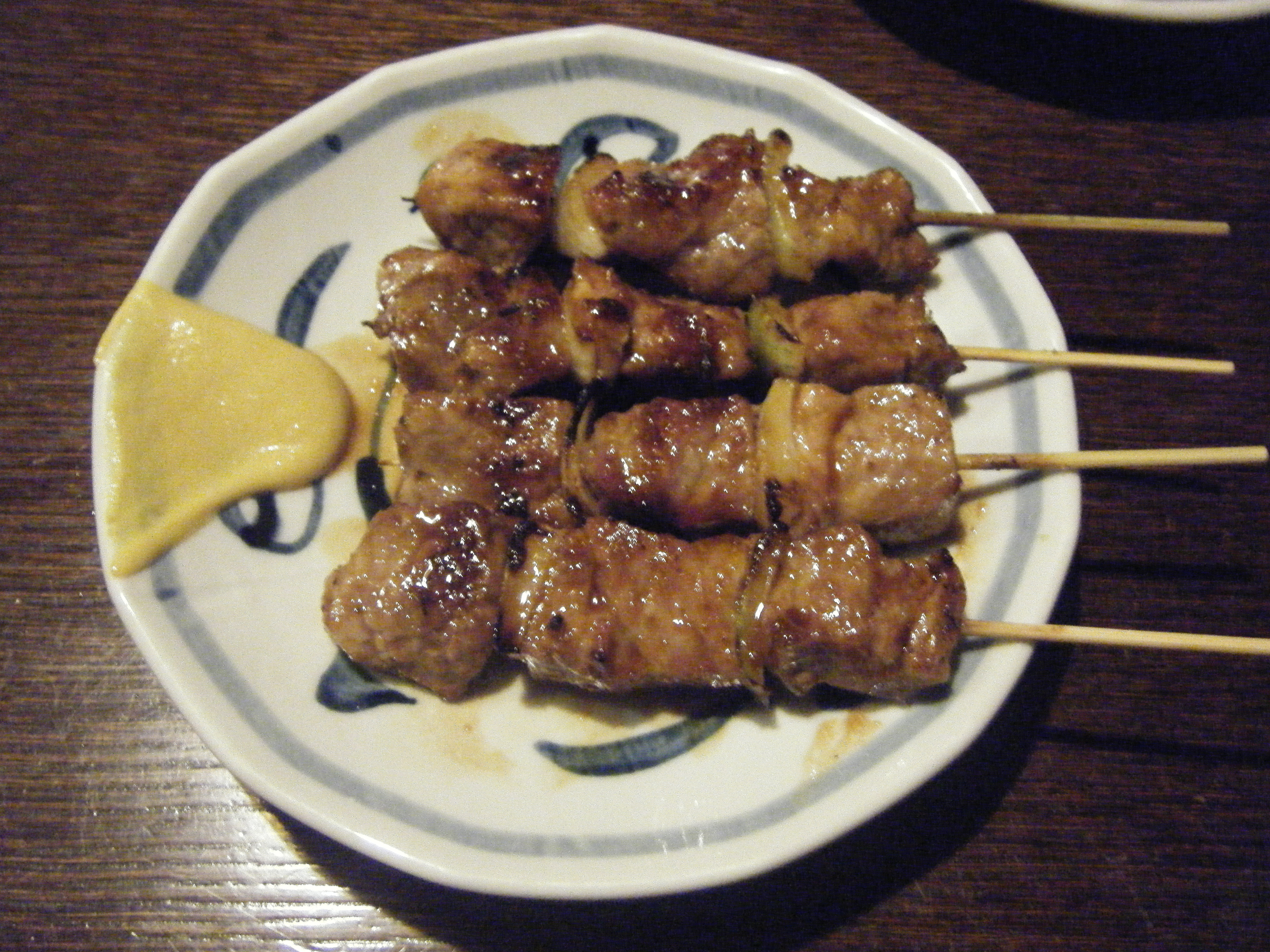
Yakitori grilled chicken

Below are listed some of the most common categories for prepared food:

- Yakimono (焼き物), grilled and pan-fried dishes
- Nimono (煮物), stewed/simmered/cooked/boiled dishes
- Itamemono (炒め物), stir-fried dishes
- Mushimono (蒸し物), steamed dishes
- Agemono (揚げ物), deep-fried dishes
- Sashimi (刺身), sliced raw fish
- Suimono (吸い物) and shirumono (汁物), soups
- Tsukemono (漬け物), pickled/salted vegetables
- Aemono (和え物), dishes dressed with various kinds of sauce
- Sunomono (酢の物), vinegared dishes
- Chinmi (珍味), delicacies

== Classification ==
=== Kaiseki ===
Kaiseki, closely associated with tea ceremony (chanoyu), is a high form of hospitality through cuisine. The style is minimalist, extolling the aesthetics of wabi-sabi. Like the tea ceremony, appreciation of the diningware and vessels is part of the experience. In the modern standard form, the first course consists of ichijū-sansai (one soup, three dishes), followed by the serving of sake accompanied by dish(es) plated on a square wooden bordered tray of sorts called hassun (八寸). Sometimes another element called shiizakana (強肴) is served to complement the sake, for guests who are heavier drinkers.

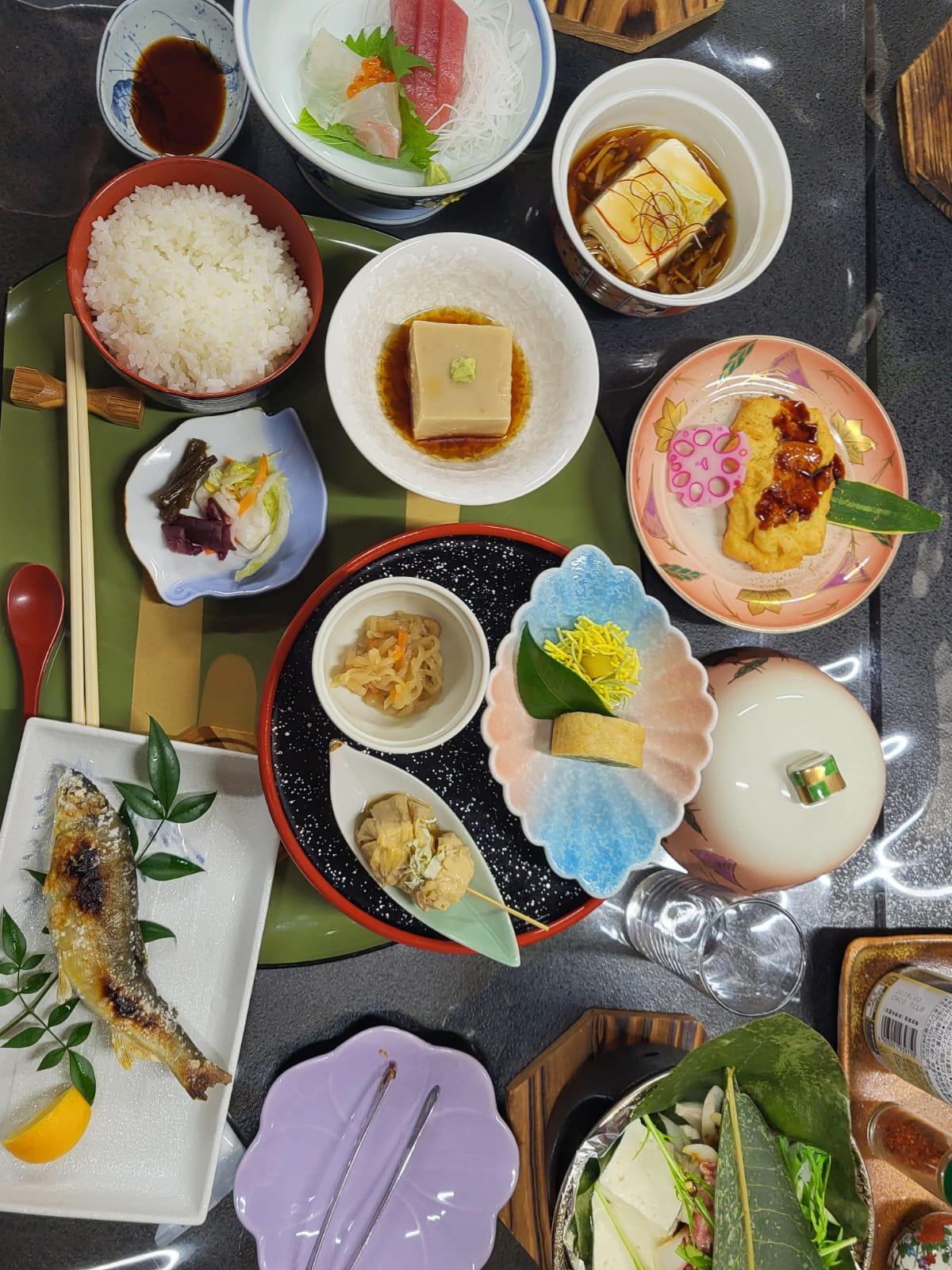
Kaiseki set at a Ryokan in Isehara prefecture, Ooyama

=== Vegetarian ===
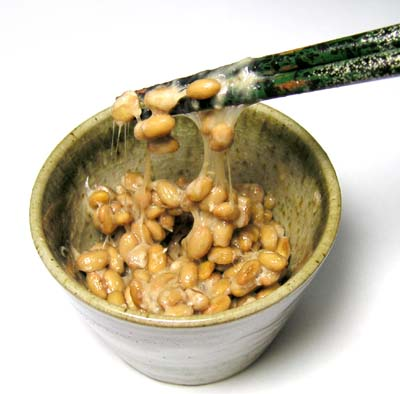
Nattō, Japanese soybean-based food. Natto is generally a popular breakfast okazu.

Strictly vegetarian food is rare since even vegetable dishes are flavored with the ubiquitous dashi stock, usually made with katsuobushi (dried skipjack tuna flakes), and are therefore pescetarian more often than carnivorous. An exception is shōjin-ryōri (精進料理), vegetarian dishes developed by Buddhist monks. However, the advertised shōjin-ryōri at public eating places includes some non-vegetarian elements. Vegetarianism, fucha-ryōri (普茶料理) was introduced from China by the Ōbaku sect (a sub-sect of Zen Buddhism), and which some sources still regard as part of "Japanese cuisine". The sect in Japan was founded by the priest Ingen (d. 1673), and is headquartered in Uji, Kyoto. The Japanese name for the common green bean takes after this priest who allegedly introduced the New World crop via China. One aspect of the fucha-ryōri practiced at the temple is the wealth of modoki-ryōri (もどき料理, "mock foods"), one example being mock-eel, made from strained tofu, with nori seaweed used expertly to mimic the black skin. The secret ingredient used is grated gobō (burdock) roots.

Masakazu Tada, Honorary Vice-President of the International Vegetarian Union for 25 years from 1960, stated that "Japan was vegetarian for 1,000 years". The taboo against eating meat was lifted in 1872 by the Meiji Emperor as part of an effort towards westernizing Japan. British journalist J. W. Robertson Scott reported in the 1920s that the society was still 90% vegetarian, and 50–60% of the population ate fish only on festive occasions, probably due to poverty more than for any other reason.

=== Regional cuisine ===
Japanese cuisine offers a vast array of regional specialties known as kyōdo-ryōri (郷土料理), many of them originating from dishes prepared using traditional recipes with local ingredients. Foods from the Kantō region taste very strong. For example, the dashi-based broth for serving udon noodles is heavy on dark soy sauce, similar to soba broth. On the other hand, Kansai region foods are lightly seasoned, with clear udon noodles. made with light soy sauce.

== Dishes for special occasions ==
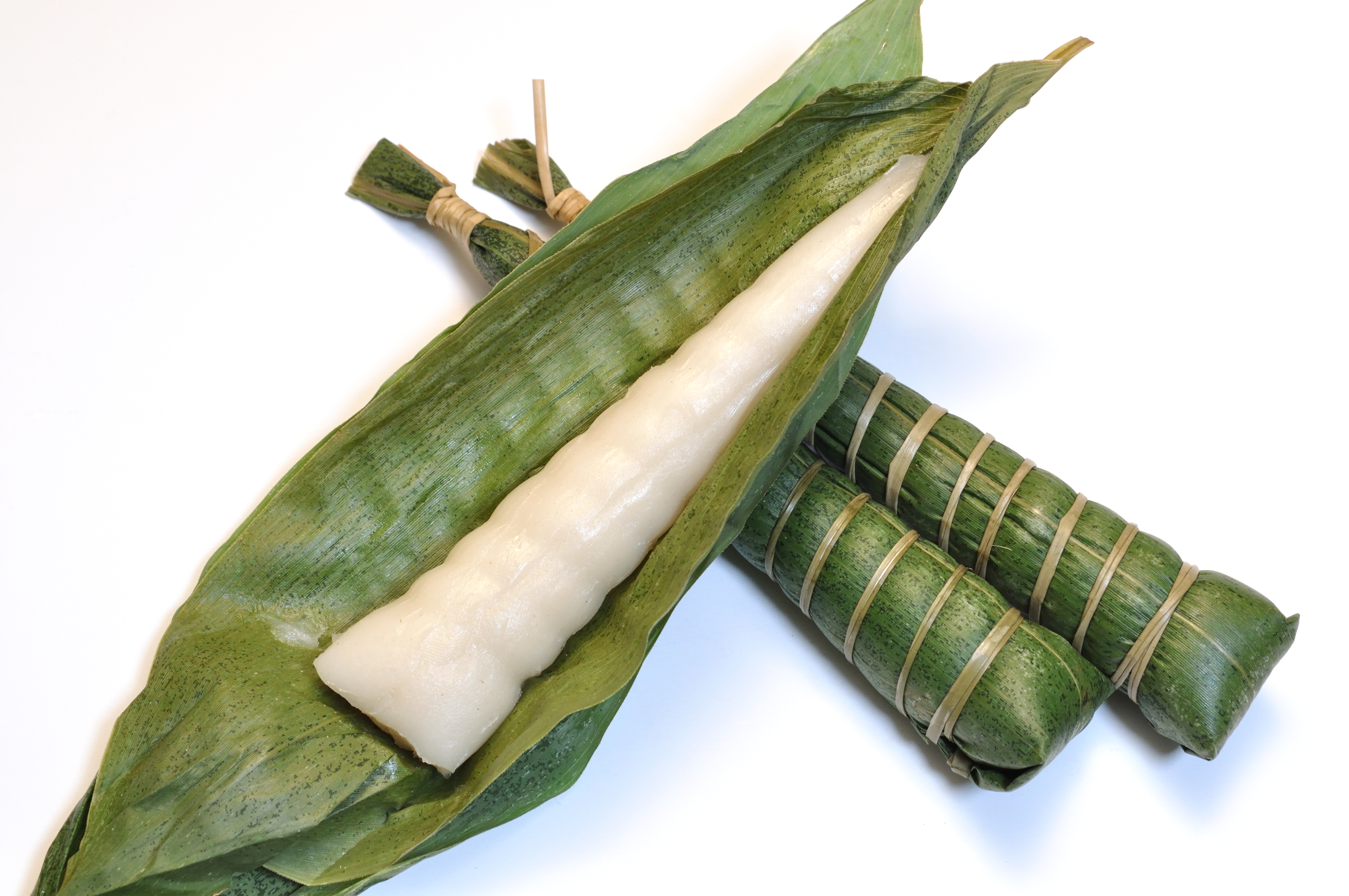
Chimaki

In Japanese tradition, some dishes are strongly tied to a festival or event. These dishes include:

Image	Name	Description
	Botamochi	A sticky rice dumpling with sweet azuki paste served in spring; a similar sweet ohagi is served in autumn.
	Chimaki	Steamed sweet rice cake served during tango no sekku and Gion Festival.
	Hamo	A type of fish, often eel and sōmen: Gion Festival.
	Osechi	Special dishes served on new year.
	Sekihan	Red rice, which is served for any celebratory occasion. It is usually sticky rice cooked with azuki, or red bean, which gives the rice its distinctive red colour.
	Soba	New Year's Eve, called toshikoshi soba (literally "year crossing soba").
	Chirashizushi, ushiojiru (clear soup of clams), amazake	Hinamatsuri

In some regions, on every first and fifteenth day of the month, people eat a mixture of rice and azuki (azuki meshi (小豆飯); see Sekihan).

== Imported and adapted foods ==
Japan has a long history of importing food from other countries, some of which are now part of Japan's most popular cuisine. Ramen is considered an important part to their culinary history, to the extent where in survey of 2,000 Tokyo residents, instant ramen came up many times as a product they thought was an outstanding Japanese invention. Believed to have originated in China, ramen became popular in Japan after the Second Sino-Japanese War (1937–1945), when many Chinese students were displaced to Japan.

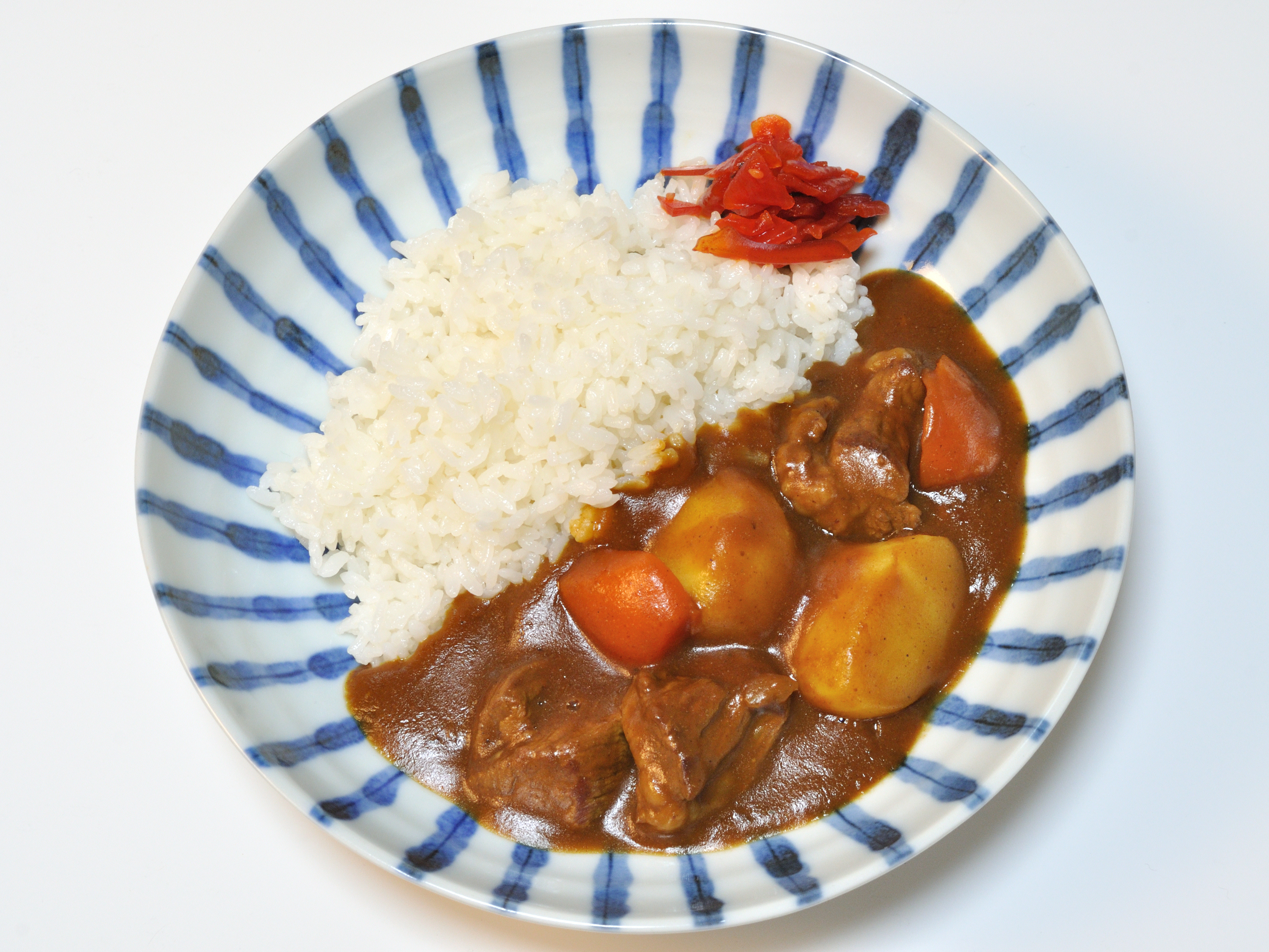
Curry is so widely consumed that it can be called a national dish.

Curry is another popular imported dish and is ranked near the top of nearly all Japanese surveys for favorite foods. The origins of curry, as well many other foreign imports such as pan or bread, are linked to the emergence of yōshoku, or western cuisine. Yōshoku can be traced as far back as the late Muromachi period (1336–1573) during a culinary revolution called namban ryori (南蛮料理), which means "Southern barbarian cooking", as it is rooted in European cuisine. This cuisine style was first seen in Nagasaki, which served as the point of contact between Europe and Japan at that point in time. Food items such as potatoes, corn, dairy products, as well as the hard candy kompeito (金平糖), spread during this time. This cuisine became popular in the Meiji era, which is considered by many historians to be when Japan first opened itself to the outside world.

Bread was not a traditional food in Japan, but shokupan, or Japanese milk bread, was developed and came into broad use after the American response to post-World War II Japanese rice shortages included relief shipments of wheat.

Today, many of these imported items still hold a heavy presence in Japan.

- Foods imported from Portugal in the 16th century
- Other adapted cuisines in Japan

=== Yōshoku—Foreign (Western) food, dishes ===
Source: Japan today abounds with home-grown, loosely Western-style food. Many of these were invented in the wake of the 1868 Meiji Restoration and the end of national seclusion, when the sudden influx of foreign (in particular, Western) culture led to many restaurants serving Western food, known as yōshoku (洋食), a shortened form of seiyōshoku (西洋食, "Western cuisine"), opening up in cities. Restaurants that serve these foods are called yōshokuya (洋食屋, "Western cuisine restaurants").

Many yōshoku items from that time have been adapted to a degree that they are now considered Japanese and are an integral part of any Japanese family menu. Many are served alongside rice and miso soup, and eaten with chopsticks. Yet, due to their origins these are still categorized as yōshoku as opposed to the more traditional washoku (和食, "Japanese cuisine").

=== Chūka ryōri—Japanese Chinese cuisine ===
Chinese cuisine is one of the oldest and most prominent foreign influences on Japanese cuisine, predating the introduction of Western influences into the country by thousands of years. Many elements of Chinese cuisine have been fully assimilated into Japanese culinary traditions.

A domesticated variety of peach from China appeared in Japan around 4700–4400 BCE, during the Jōmon period. The Yayoi period arrived with immigrants from mainland East Asia introducing rice agriculture and other elements of continental material culture to the Japanese archipelago. The migration of early rice farmers into Japan coincided with a range of sociopolitical transformations occurring in China, beginning with the eastward expansion of the Shang dynasty from 1600 to 1400 BCE. It is believed that rice farming spread to Japan from the Yangtze River Delta to the Shandong peninsula, then to the Liaodong peninsula, and finally to the Korean peninsula, from where it was directly introduced to the Japanese archipelago.

Chopsticks were adopted from China around the latter half of the 7th century, during the Asuka period, with the earliest known examples in Japan discovered at archaeological sites such as Asuka Itabuki-no-miya and Fujiwara-kyo. Tea, soy sauce, tofu, and noodles were borrowed from China in the 8th century, during the Nara period. The Shippoku culinary style of Nagasaki, which originated in the 17th century, reflects strong Chinese influences.

These early elements are generally considered distinct from modern Japanese Chinese cuisine, known as chūka ryōri, which emerged in the 19th century. Iconic dishes of chūka ryōri include ramen, gyoza, and chukaman. In contrast, earlier dishes of Chinese origin such as kakuni and karaage are often regarded as part of washoku, or traditional Japanese cuisine, due to their longstanding integration into Japanese food culture.

=== Okonomiyaki ===
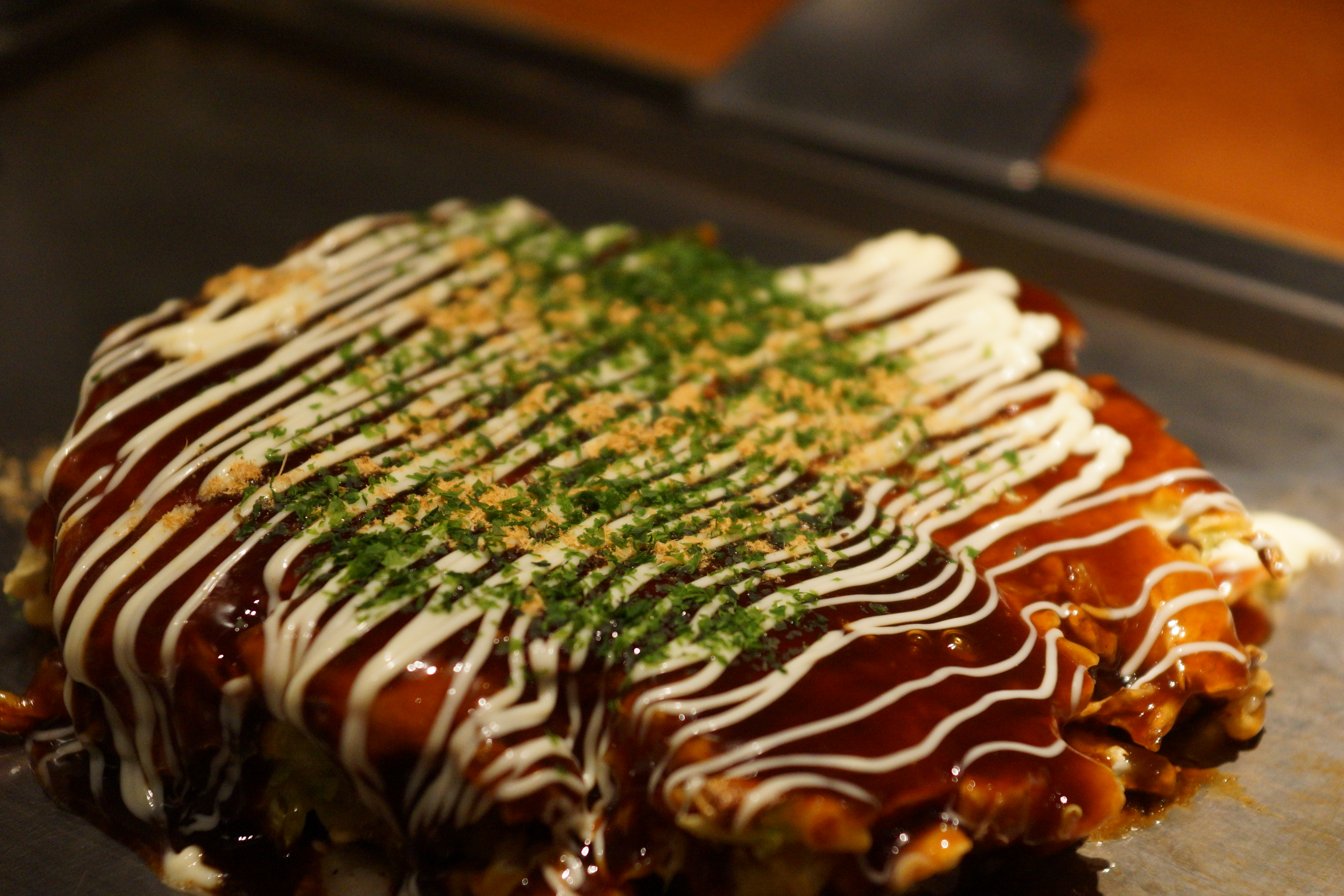
Japanese pancake, Okonomiyaki

Okonomiyaki is a savoury pancake containing a variety of ingredients in a wheat-flour-based batter.

=== Tonkatsu ===
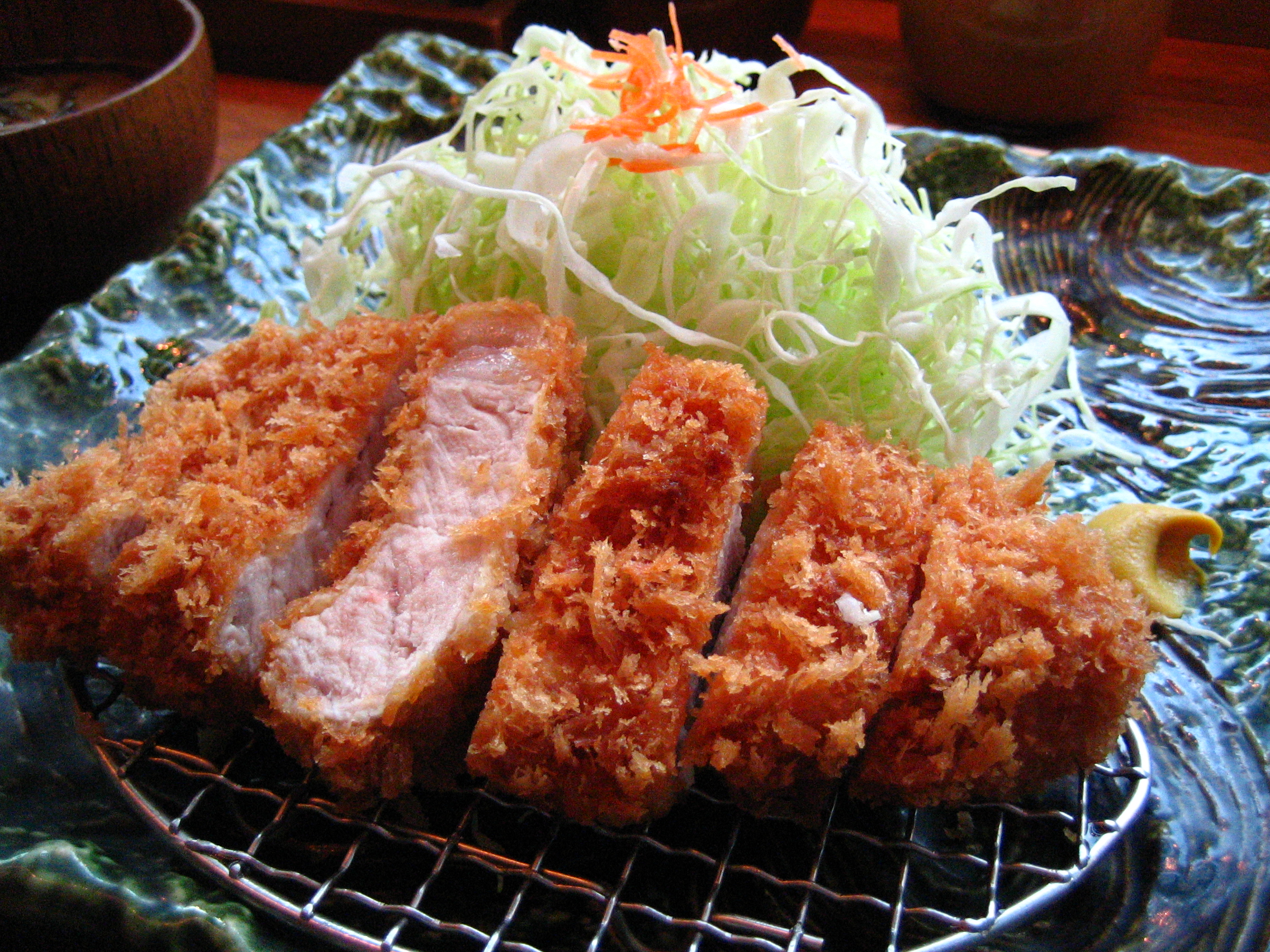
Tonkatsu pork cutlet

Tonkatsu is a breaded, deep-fried pork cutlet. It is frequently served with tonkatsu sauce.

=== Curry ===
Curry was introduced by Anglo-Indian officers of the Royal Navy from India who brought curry powder to Japan in the Meiji era. The Imperial Japanese Navy adopted curry to prevent beriberi. Overtime it was reinvented and adapted to suit Japanese tastes that it became uniquely Japanese. It is consumed so much that it is considered a national dish. Many recipes are on the menu of the JMSDF. A variety of vegetables and meats are used to make Japanese curry, usually vegetables like onions, carrots, and potatoes. The types of meat used are beef, pork, and chicken. A popular dish is Katsu-karē which is a breaded deep-fried cutlet (tonkatsu; usually pork or chicken) with Japanese curry sauce. Japanese curry can be found in foods such as curry udon, curry bread, and katsukarē, tonkatsu served with curry. It's very commonly made with rice beside the curry on the dish called "curry" (カレー, karē). This can be eaten during dinner.

=== Wafū burgers (Japanese-style burgers) ===
Hamburger chains active in Japan include McDonald's, Burger King, First Kitchen, Lotteria and MOS Burger. Many chains developed uniquely Japanese versions of American fast food such as the teriyaki burger, kinpira (sauté) rice burger, fried shrimp burgers, and green tea milkshakes.

=== Italian ===
High-class Japanese chefs have preserved many Italian seafood dishes that are forgotten in other countries. These include pasta with prawns, lobster (a specialty known in Italy as pasta all'aragosta), crab (an Italian specialty; in Japan it is served with a different species of crab), and pasta with sea urchin sauce (sea urchin pasta being a specialty of the Puglia region).

== Outside Japan ==
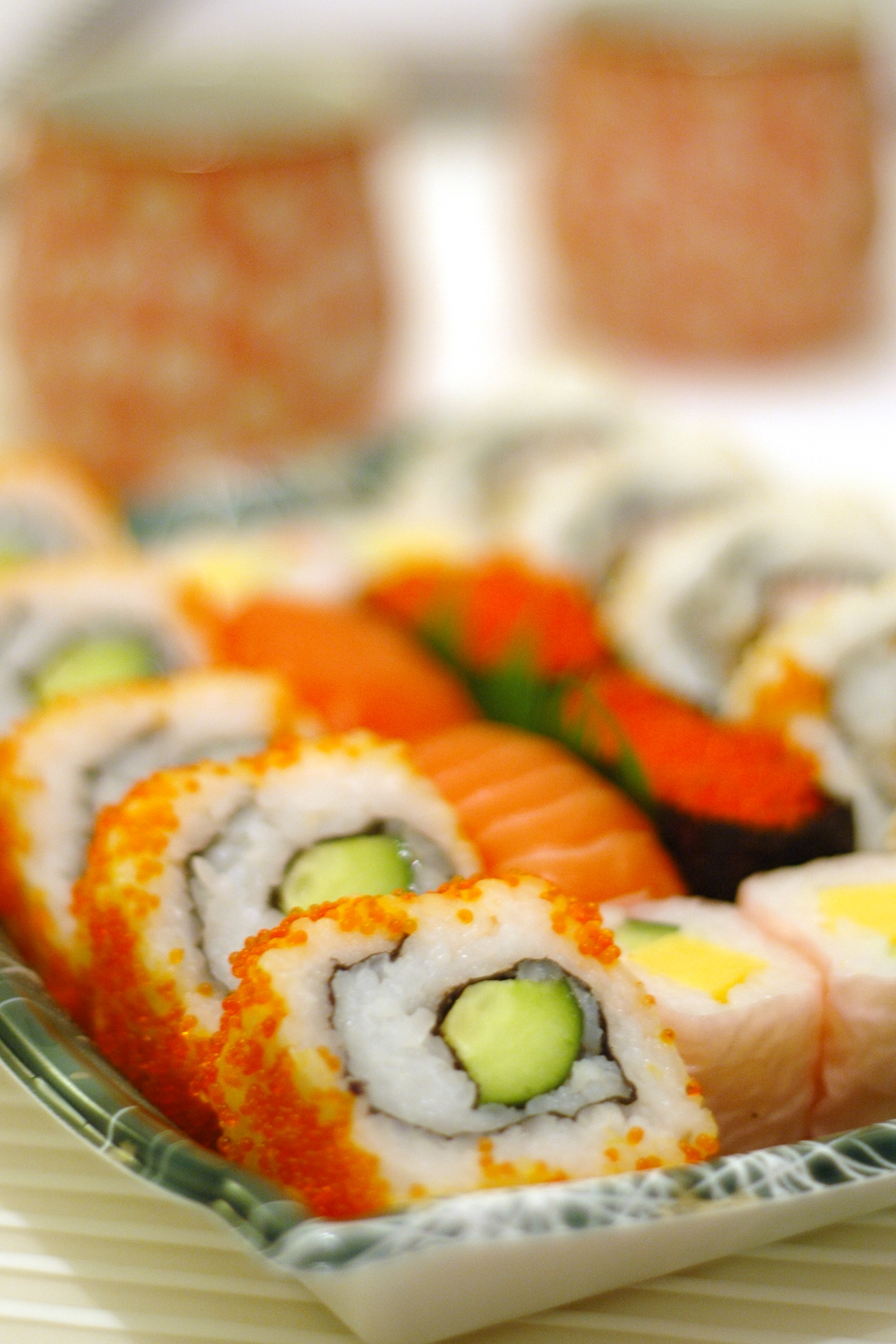
California roll, a fusion makizushi created outside of Japan

Many countries have imported portions of Japanese cuisine. Some may adhere to the traditional preparations of the cuisines, but in some cultures the dishes have been adapted to fit the palate of the local populace. In 1970s sushi travelled from Japan to Canada and the United States, it was modified to suit the American palate, and re-entered the Japanese market as "American Sushi". An example of this phenomenon is the California roll, which was created in North America in the 1970s, rose in popularity across the United States through the 1980s, and thus sparked Japanese food's—more precisely, sushi's—global popularity.

In 2014, Japanese Restaurant Organization has selected potential countries where Japanese food is becoming increasingly popular, and conducted research concerning the Japanese restaurants abroad. These key nations or region are Taiwan, Hong Kong, China, Singapore, Thailand and Indonesia. This was meant as an effort to promote Japanese cuisine and to expand the market of Japanese ingredients, products and foodstuffs. Numbers of Japanese foodstuff and seasoning brands such as Ajinomoto, Kikkoman, Nissin and Kewpie mayonnaise, are establishing production base in other Asian countries, such as China, Thailand and Indonesia.

=== Singapore ===
Japanese cuisine in Singapore began when the first batch of Japanese restaurants opened in the 1960s to cater to Japanese businessmen. As Singaporeans became increasingly well-travelled, local diners started developing a deeper appreciation for Japanese cuisine's subtleties. This led to the transformation of Japanese food in Singapore from a niche expatriate dining scene to a diverse ecosystem of more than 1,000 Japanese restaurants today.

With large amounts of sushi bars, ramen shops and udon houses Singapore has a comprehensive Japanese dining scene. The fine dining scene of Japanese cuisine in Singapore has flourished in particular. Numerous omakase restaurants have gained recognition, such as Wakuda and the Michelin-starred Waku Ghin.

=== Australia ===
Japanese cuisine is very popular in Australia, and Australians are becoming increasingly familiar with traditional Japanese foods. Restaurants serving Japanese cuisine feature prominently in popular rankings, including Gourmet Traveller and The Good Food Guide.

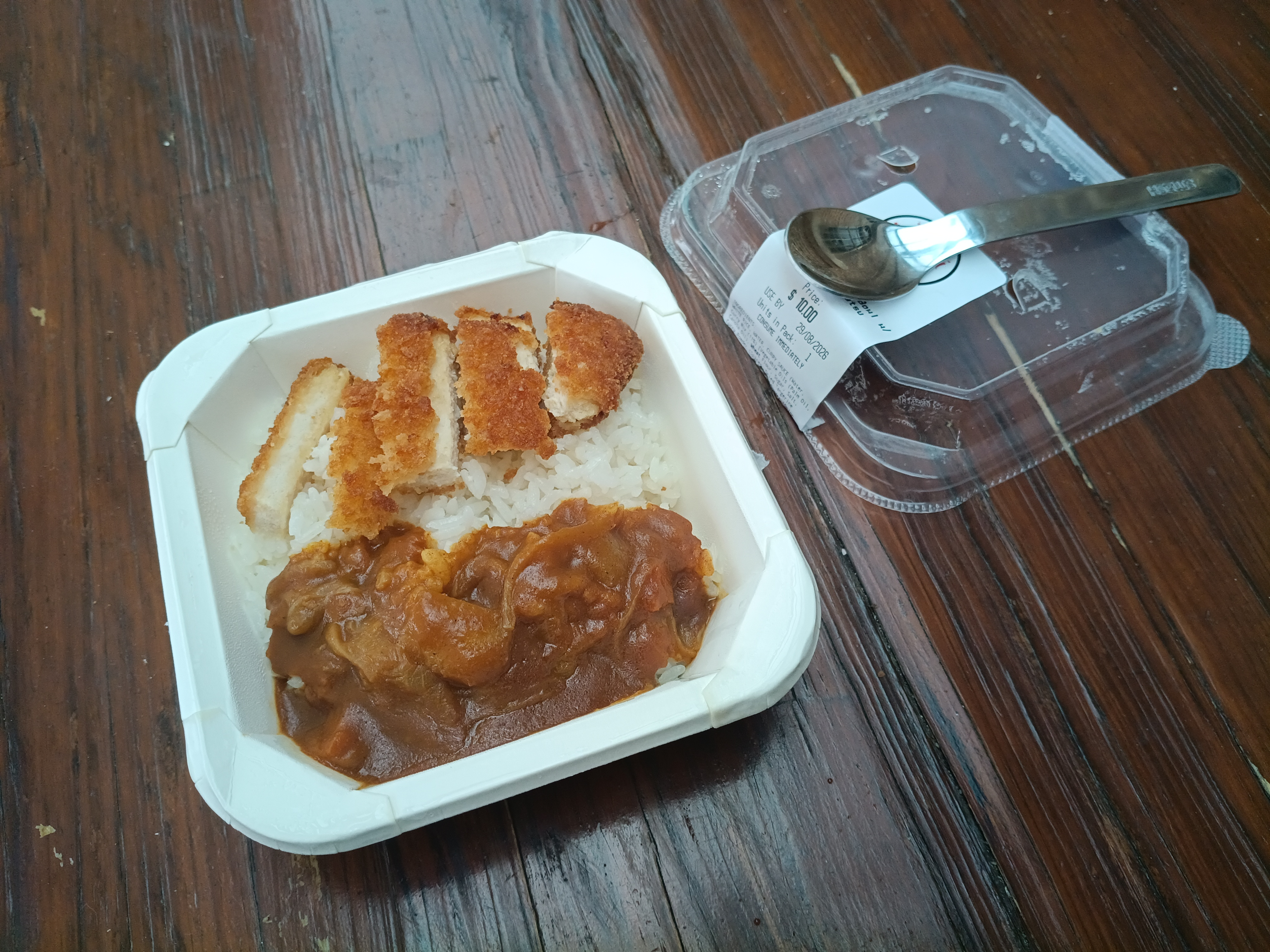
A Japanese chicken katsu curry bowl from a Woolworths supermarket in Newcastle.

Sushi in particular has been described as being "as popular as sandwiches", particularly in large cities like Melbourne, Sydney, or Brisbane. As such, sushi bars are a mainstay in shopping centre food courts, and are extremely common in cities and towns all over the country.

=== Brazil ===
In Brazil, Japanese food is widespread due to the large Japanese-Brazilian population living in the country, which represents the largest Japanese community living outside Japan. Over the past years, many restaurant chains such as Koni Store have opened, selling typical dishes such as the popular temaki. Yakisoba, which is readily available in all supermarkets, and often included in non-Japanese restaurant menus.

=== Canada ===
In Canada, Japanese cuisine has become quite popular. Sushi, sashimi, and instant ramen are highly popular at opposite ends of the income scale, with instant ramen being a common low-budget meal. Sushi and sashimi takeout began in Vancouver and Toronto, and is now common throughout Canada. The largest supermarket chains all carry basic sushi and sashimi, and Japanese ingredients and instant ramen are readily available in most supermarkets. Most mid-sized mall food courts feature fast-food teppan cooking. Izakaya restaurants have surged in popularity. Higher-end ramen restaurants (as opposed to instant ramen noodles of variable quality) are increasingly common.

=== Indonesia ===
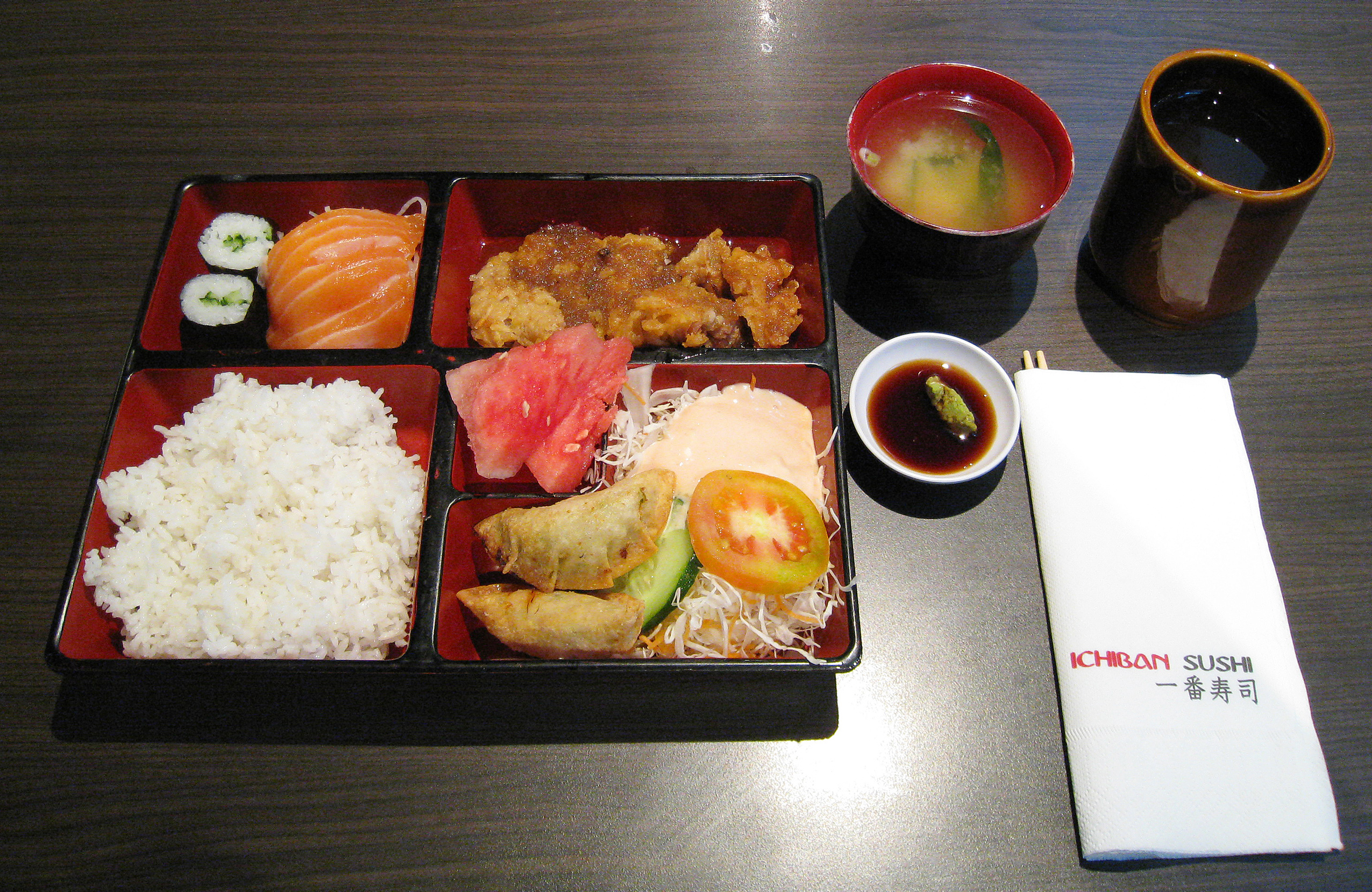
Chicken teriyaki bento set, including salmon sashimi, gyoza, salad and miso soup, served in a Japanese restaurant in Jakarta

In the ASEAN region, Indonesia is the second largest market for Japanese food, after Thailand. Japanese cuisine has been increasingly popular as a result of the growing Indonesian middle-class expecting higher quality foods. This has also contributed to the fact that Indonesia has large numbers of Japanese expatriates. The main concern is the issue of many traditional Japanese recipes not being halal. As a Muslim majority country, observant Indonesian Muslims expect that Japanese foods served there are halal according to Islamic dietary law, which means no pork or alcohol are allowed. Japanese restaurants in Indonesia often offer a set menu which includes rice served with an array of Japanese favourites in a single setting. A set menu might include a choice of yakiniku or sukiyaki, including a sample of sushi, tempura, gyoza and miso soup. Authentic Japanese style izakaya and ramen shops can be found in the Little Tokyo (Melawai) area in Blok M, South Jakarta, serving both Japanese expats and local clienteles. Today, Japanese restaurants can be found in most major Indonesian cities, with a high concentration in Greater Jakarta area, Bandung, Surabaya and Bali.

In some cases, Japanese cuisine in Indonesia is often altered to suit Indonesian taste. Hoka Hoka Bento in particular is an Indonesian-owned Japanese fast food restaurant chain that caters to the Indonesian clientele. As a result, the foods served there have been adapted to suit Indonesians' taste. Examples of the change include stronger flavours compared to the authentic subtle Japanese taste, the preference for fried food, as well as the addition of sambal to cater to the Indonesians' preference for hot and spicy food.

Japanese food popularity also has penetrated street food culture, as modest Warjep or Warung Jepang (Japanese food stall) offer Japanese food such as tempura, okonomiyaki and takoyaki, at moderately low prices. Today, okonomiyaki and takoyaki are popular street fare in Jakarta and other Indonesian cities. This is also pushed further by the Japanese convenience stores operating in Indonesia, such as 7-Eleven and Lawson offering Japanese favourites such as oden, chicken katsu (deep-fried chicken cutlet), chicken teriyaki and onigiri.

Some chefs in Indonesian sushi establishments have created a Japanese-Indonesian fusion cuisine, such as krakatau roll, gado-gado roll, rendang roll and gulai ramen. The idea of fusion cuisine melding spicy Indonesian Padang and Japanese cuisine was combined because both cuisine traditions are well-liked by Indonesians. Nevertheless, some of these Japanese eating establishments might strive to serve authentic Japanese cuisine abroad. Numbers of Japanese chain restaurants has established their business in Indonesia, such as Yoshinoya gyūdon restaurant chain, Gyu-Kaku yakiniku restaurant chain and Ajisen Ramen restaurant chain.

=== Mexico ===
In Mexico, certain Japanese restaurants have created what is known as "sushi Mexicano", in which spicy sauces and ingredients accompany the dish or are integrated in sushi rolls. The habanero and serrano chiles have become nearly standard and are referred to as chiles toreados, as they are fried, diced and tossed over a dish upon request.

=== Philippines ===
In the Philippines, Japanese cuisine is also popular among the local population. The Philippines have been exposed to the influences from the Japanese, Indian and Chinese. The cities of Davao and Metro Manila probably have the most Japanese influence in the country. The popular dining spots for Japanese nationals are located in Makati, which is called as "Little Tokyo", a small area filled with restaurants specializing in different types of Japanese food. Some of the best Japanese no-frills restaurants in the Philippines can be found in Makati's "Little Tokyo" area. In the Philippines, Halo-halo is derived from Japanese Kakigori. Halo-halo is believed to be an indigenized version of the Japanese kakigori class of desserts, originating from pre-war Japanese migrants into the islands. The earliest versions were composed only of cooked red beans or mung beans in crushed ice with sugar and milk, a dessert known locally as "mongo-ya". Over the years, more native ingredients were added, resulting in the development of the modern halo-halo. Some authors specifically attribute it to the 1920s or 1930s Japanese migrants in the Quinta Market of Quiapo, Manila, due to its proximity to the now defunct Insular Ice Plant, which was the source of the city's ice supply.

In Cebu City, the Little Kyoto district enables people to experience the feel of being in Kyoto, Japan with a statue of the reclining Buddha overlooking the city. The Little Kyoto district also features Japanese food stalls serving various Japanese dishes like Takoyaki, Tempura, and various other Japanese cuisine that is enjoyed by the people of Cebu City, Philippines. Odong, also called pancit odong, is a Visayan noodle soup made with odong noodles, canned smoked sardines (tinapa) in tomato sauce, bottle gourd (upo), loofah (patola), chayote, ginger, garlic, red onions, and various other vegetables. It is garnished and spiced with black pepper, scallions, toasted garlic, calamansi, or labuyo chilis. The dish is usually prepared as a soup, but it can also be cooked with minimal water, in which case, it is known as odong guisado.

It is a common simple and cheap meal in Mindanao (particularly the Davao Region) and the Visayas Islands. It is almost always eaten with white rice, rarely on its own.

It is named after the round flour noodles called odong which are closest in texture and taste to the Okinawa soba. These noodles are characteristically sold dried into straight sticks around 6 to 8 in (15 to 20 cm) long. The name is derived from the Japanese udon noodles, although it does not use udon noodles or bear any resemblance to udon dishes. It originates from the Davao Region of Mindanao which had a large Japanese migrant community in the early 1900s. The odong noodles were previously locally manufactured by Okinawans, but modern odong noodles (which are distinctly yellowish) are imported from China. Because odong noodles are difficult to find in other regions, they can be substituted with other types of noodles; including misua, miki (egg noodles), udon, and even instant noodles.

=== Taiwan ===
Japan and Taiwan have shared close historical and cultural relations. Dishes such as sushi, ramen, and donburi are very popular among locals. Japanese chain restaurants such as Coco Ichibanya, Ippudo, Kura Sushi, Marugame Seimen, Mister Donut, MOS Burger, Ootoya, Ramen Kagetsu Arashi, Saizeriya, Sukiya, Sushiro, Tonkatsu Shinjuku Saboten, Yayoi Ken, and Yoshinoya, can all be found in Taiwan, among others. Taiwan has adapted many Japanese food items. Tianbula ("Taiwanese tempura") is actually satsuma-age and was introduced to Taiwan during Japanese rule by people from Kyushu, where the word tempura is commonly used to refer to satsuma-age. It is popular as a night market snack and as an ingredient for oden, hot pot and lu wei. Taiwanese versions of oden are sold locally as olen or, more recently, as guandongzhu (from Japanese Kantō-ni) in convenience stores.

=== Thailand ===
In Southeast Asia, Thailand is the largest market for Japanese food. This is partly because Thailand is a popular tourist destination, having large numbers of Japanese expatriates, as well as the local population having developed a taste for authentic Japanese cuisine. According to the Organisation that Promote Japanese Restaurants Abroad (JRO), the number of Japanese restaurants in Thailand jumped about 2.2-fold from 2007's figures to 1,676 in June 2012. In Bangkok, Japanese restaurants accounts for 8.3 percent of all restaurants, following those that serve Thai. Numbers of Japanese chain restaurants has established their business in Thailand, such as Yoshinoya gyūdon restaurant chain, Gyu-Kaku yakiniku restaurant chain and Kourakuen ramen restaurant chain.

=== United Kingdom ===
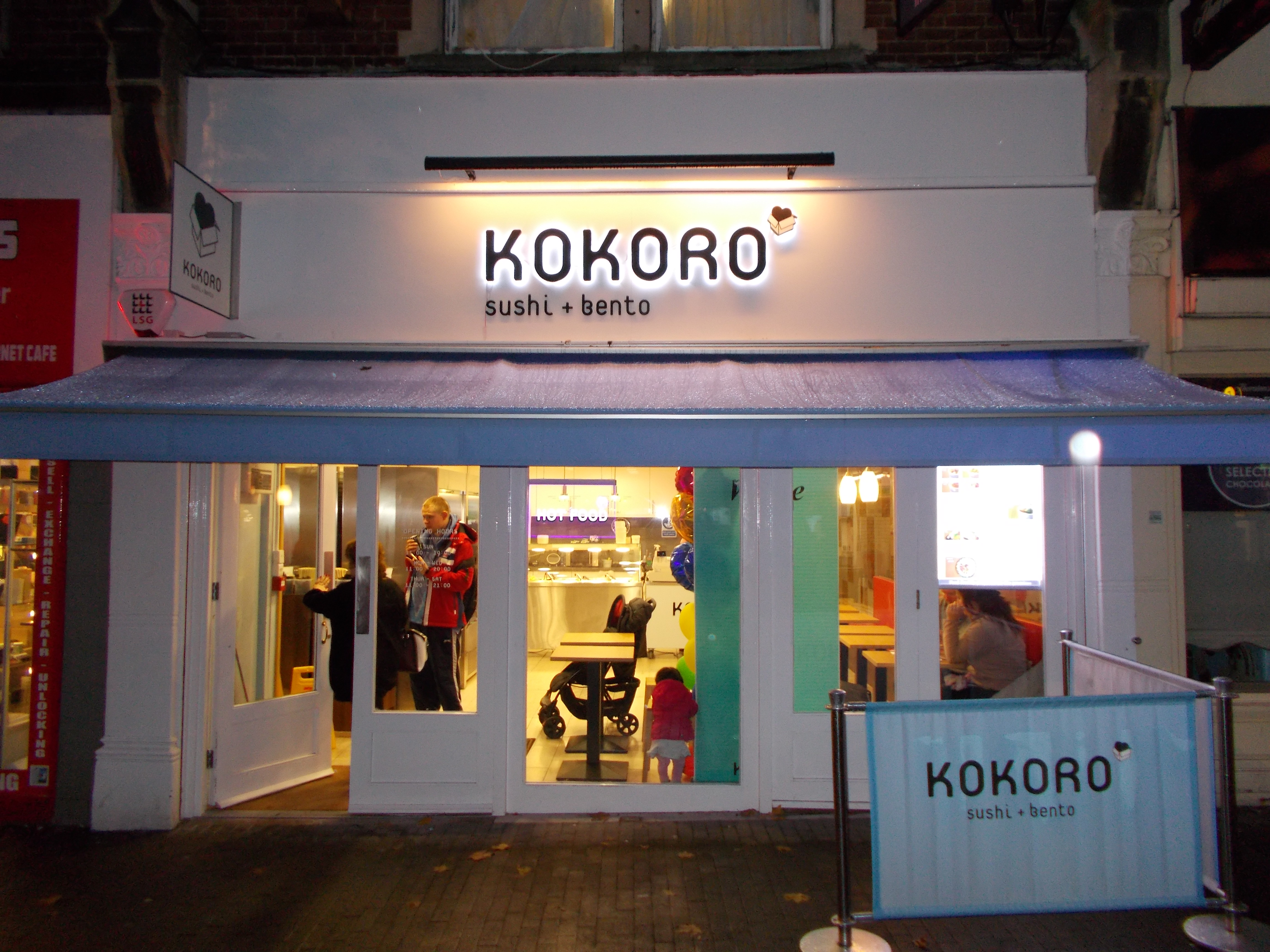
A branch of Kokoro in Sutton High Street, Sutton, Greater London

Japanese food Inspired restaurant chains in the UK include Wagamama, YO! Sushi, Nudo Sushi Box, Wasabi, Bone Daddies and Kokoro, often localising the food and mixing in other ingredients originating from Southeast Asia and India.

=== United States ===
The California roll has been influential in sushi's global popularity; its invention often credited to a Japanese-born chef working in Los Angeles, with dates assigned to 1973, or even 1964. The dish has been snubbed by some purist sushi chefs, and also likened to the American-born chop suey by one scholar.

As of 2015 the country has about 4,200 sushi restaurants. It is one of the most popular styles of sushi in the US market. Japanese cuisine is an integral part of food culture in Hawaii as well as in other parts of the United States. Popular items are sushi, sashimi, and teriyaki. Kamaboko, known locally as fish cake, is a staple of saimin, a noodle soup that is a local favorite in Hawaii. Sushi, long regarded as quite exotic in the west until the 1970s, has become a popular health food in parts of North America, Western Europe and Asia.

Two of the first Japanese restaurants in the United States were Saito and Nippon. Restaurants such as these popularized dishes such as sukiyaki and tempura, while Nippon was the first restaurant in Manhattan to have a dedicated sushi bar. Nippon was also one of the first Japanese restaurants in the U.S. to grow and process their own soba and responsible for creation of the now standard beef negimayaki dish.

In the U.S., teppanyaki "iron hot plate" cooking restaurants took foothold. Such restaurants featured steak, shrimp and vegetables (including bean sprouts), cooked in front of the customer on a "teppanyaki grill" (teppan) by a personal chef who turns cooking into performance art, twirling and juggling cutting knives like batons. The meal would be served with steamed rice and Japanese soup. This style of cooking was made popular in the U.S. when Rocky Aoki founded his popular restaurant chain Benihana in 1964. In Japan this type of cooking is thought to be American food, but in the U.S. it is thought to be Japanese. Aoki thought this would go over better in the U.S. than traditional Japanese cuisine because he felt that Americans enjoyed "eating in exotic surroundings, but are deeply mistrustful of exotic foods".

== Food controversies ==
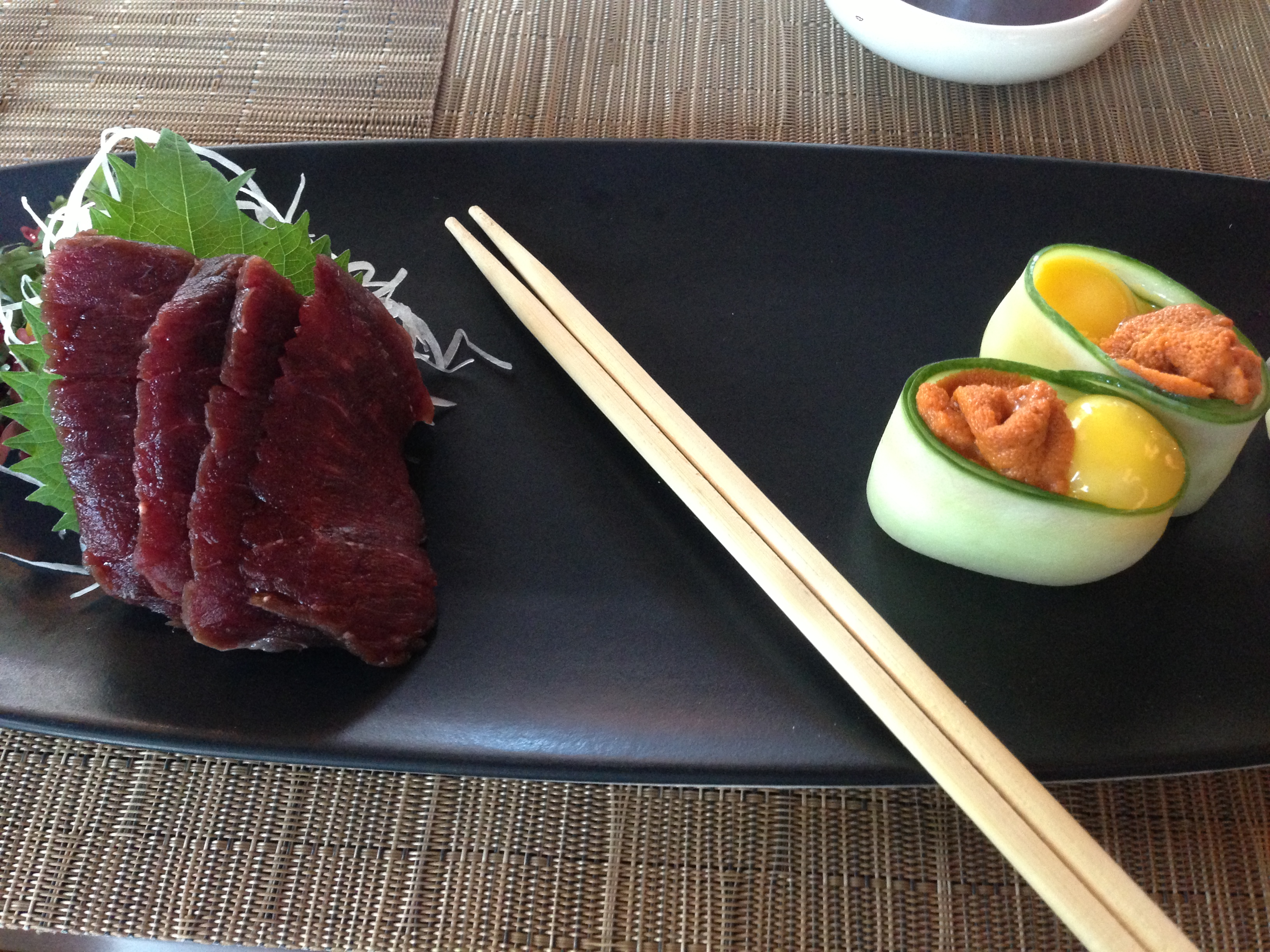
Whale meat sashimi, one of the most controversial Japanese dishes

Some elements of Japanese cuisine involving eating live seafood, such as Ikizukuri and Odori ebi, have received criticism overseas as a form of animal cruelty.

Japanese cuisine is heavily dependent on seafood products. About 45 kilograms of seafood are consumed per capita annually in Japan, more than most other developed countries. An aspect of environmental concern is Japanese appetite for seafood, which could contribute to the depletion of natural ocean resources. For example, Japan consumes 80% of the global supply of blue fin tuna, a popularly sought sushi and sashimi ingredient, which could lead to its extinction due to commercial overfishing. Another environmental concern is commercial whaling and the consumption of whale meat, for which Japan is the world's largest market.

== See also ==
- Bento
- Culture of Japan
- Fake food in Japan
- Hōchōdō
- Honzen-ryōri
- Japanese New Year
- Kaiseki
- List of Japanese condiments
- List of Japanese cooking utensils
- List of Japanese dishes
  - List of Japanese desserts and sweets
  - List of Japanese soups and stews
- List of Japanese ingredients
- List of Japanese restaurants
- List of sushi restaurants
