= Cattle in Japan =

The presence of cattle in Japan dates to about the second century AD, in the Yayoi period – about the same time that the cultivation of rice was introduced.

== Pre-history ==
In 1927, fossils of an ancient wild cattle called Hanaizumi Moriushi (Leptobison hanaizumiensis) and dating to the Paleolithic period about 20000 years ago, were discovered at the Hanaizumi Site in Ichinoseki City in Iwate Prefecture. It is a species similar to the bison, and is said to be close to the steppe bison (Bison priscus) lineage. Fossil bones of aurochs (Bos primigenius) have also been found in Ichinoseki City.

In addition, small quantities of projectile points made from polished wild cattle bones have been found at the same site. These projectile points indicate the presence of humans, with the suggestion that they hunted hanaizumi moriushi and aurochs. At the Ohama Site in Goto City, Nagasaki Prefecture, cattle teeth dating to the middle Yayoi period were excavated. Among them were also processed cattle molars. However, this excavation was controversial because it contradicted the statement in the Wajinden in Chen Shou's Records of the Three Kingdoms that there were no cattle or horses in Japan. Later, radiocarbon dating of the excavated cattle molars yielded a date of around 40 AD (±90 years).

However, some in the Japanese archaeological community remain skeptical about the presence of cattle in Japan during the Yayoi period, and there is a persistent view that they were brought to Japan from the Korean peninsula by the toraijin, a group of people who came to Japan in the mid-5th century during the Kofun period. At the Nango-Ōhigashi site in Gose City, Nara Prefecture, cow bones were excavated that are thought to date to the 5th century. At the Funamiya Kofun Tumulus (late 5th century) in Asago City, Hyogo Prefecture, pieces of a cow-shaped haniwa (clay figurine), believed to be the oldest in Japan, have been excavated. In addition, a cow-shaped haniwa was excavated from the Hashida No. 1 Tumulus in Tawaramoto Town, Shiki-gun, Nara Prefecture, which dates to the early 6th century AD. It was designated an Important Cultural Property of Japan in 1958.

On the other hand, recent genetic studies have shown that Wagyu and Korean cattle (Hanwoo and others) differ greatly in their genetic information. Livestock cattle are divided into two major lineages: northern lineage cattle (Bos taurus) and Indian lineage cattle (Bos indicus), and both Wagyu and Korean cattle belong to the northern lineage and do not contain Indian lineage such as Zebu cattle. However, in terms of mitochondrial DNA sequence haplogroups, haplogroup T4 (East Asian type) is predominant in the Wagyu (Japanese Black) at about 65%, while haplogroup T3 (European type) is predominant in Korean cattle at 66–83%. The Japanese Shorthorn was created by crossing the Nanbu cattle bred in the former Nanbu Domain territory in northeastern Japan (present-day Iwate Prefecture) with Shorthorns and other breeds imported from the United States, but P has not been detected in Shorthorns and is thought to be derived from the Nanbu cattle.

== History ==
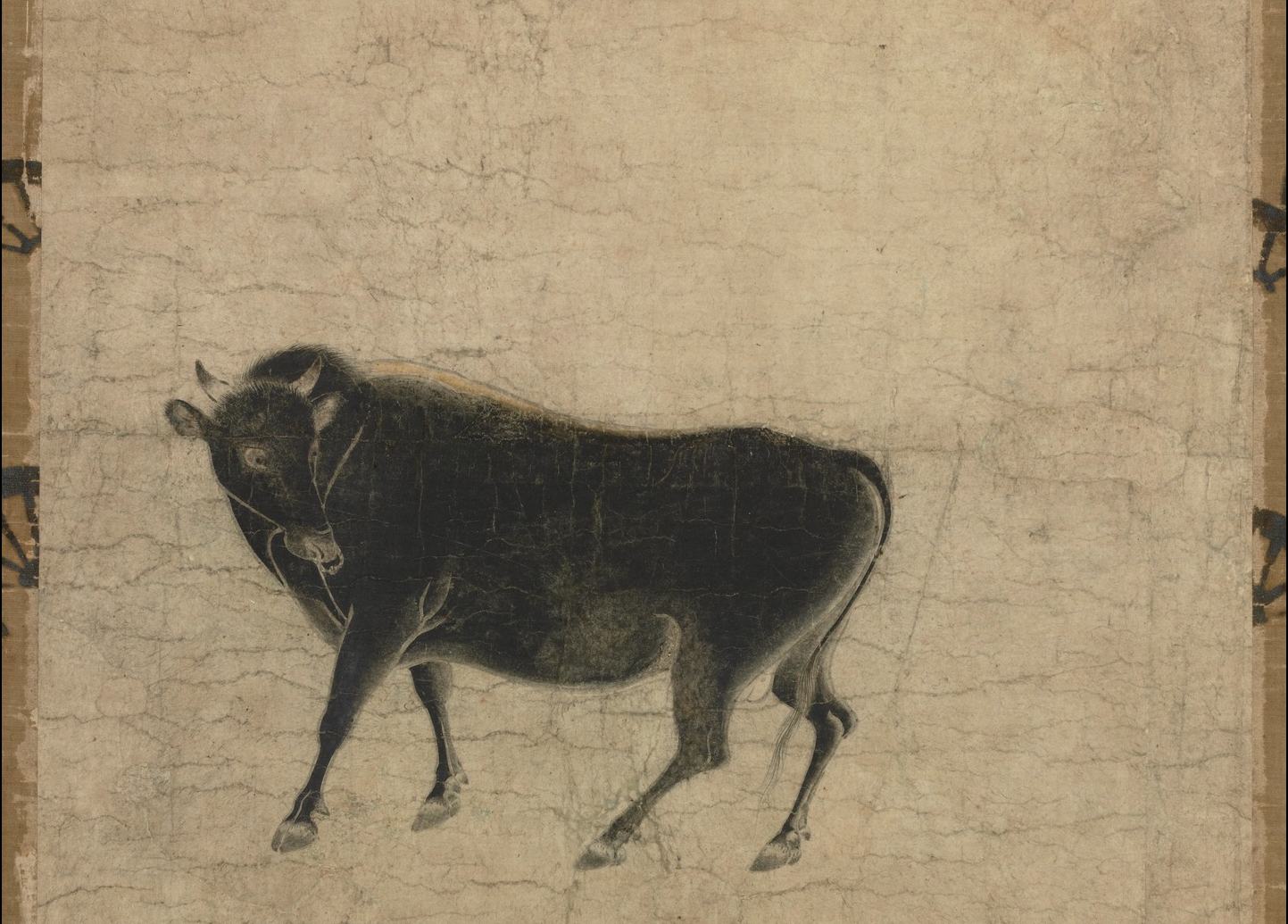
"Swift Bull", 13th century

The "Pictorial Record of Swift Bulls" (駿牛絵詞), believed to have been written around 1279, is said to be the world's oldest specialised book on bulls. Until about the time of the Meiji Restoration in 1868, cattle were used only as draught animals – in agriculture, forestry, mining and for transport – and as a source of fertiliser. Milk consumption was unknown, and – for cultural and religious reasons – meat was not eaten. Cattle were highly prized and valuable, too expensive for a poor farmer to buy.

Japan was effectively isolated from the rest of the world from 1635 until 1854; there was no possibility of intromission of foreign genes to the cattle population during this time. Between 1868, the year of the Meiji Restoration, and 1887, some 2,600 foreign cattle were imported. At first there was little interest in cross-breeding these with native stock, but from about 1900 it became widespread. It ceased abruptly in 1910, when it was realised that, while the cross-breeds might be larger and have better dairy qualities, their working capacity and meat quality was lower. From 1919, the various heterogeneous regional populations that resulted from this brief period of cross-breeding were registered and selected as "Improved Japanese Cattle". Four separate strains were characterised, based mainly on which type of foreign cattle had most influenced the hybrids, and were recognised as breeds in 1944. These were the four wagyū breeds, the Japanese Shorthorn, the Japanese Black, the Japanese Brown and the Japanese Polled.

Two other historic breeds or populations, the Kuchinoshima and the Mishima, are also recognised. The Kairyo-washu is reported as extinct.
