= List of Japanese cattle breeds =

This is a list of the cattle breeds considered in Japan to be wholly or partly of Japanese origin. Some may have complex or obscure histories, so inclusion here does not necessarily imply that a breed is predominantly or exclusively Japanese.

Local name	Other names	Notes	Image
Japanese Black		One of the four Wagyu breeds	
Japanese Brown		One of the four Wagyu breeds	
Japanese Polled		One of the four Wagyu breeds	
Japanese Shorthorn		One of the four Wagyu breeds	
Kairyo-washu		extinct	
Kuchinoshima			
Mishima			
