= Kobe beef =

Type of beef from Japan

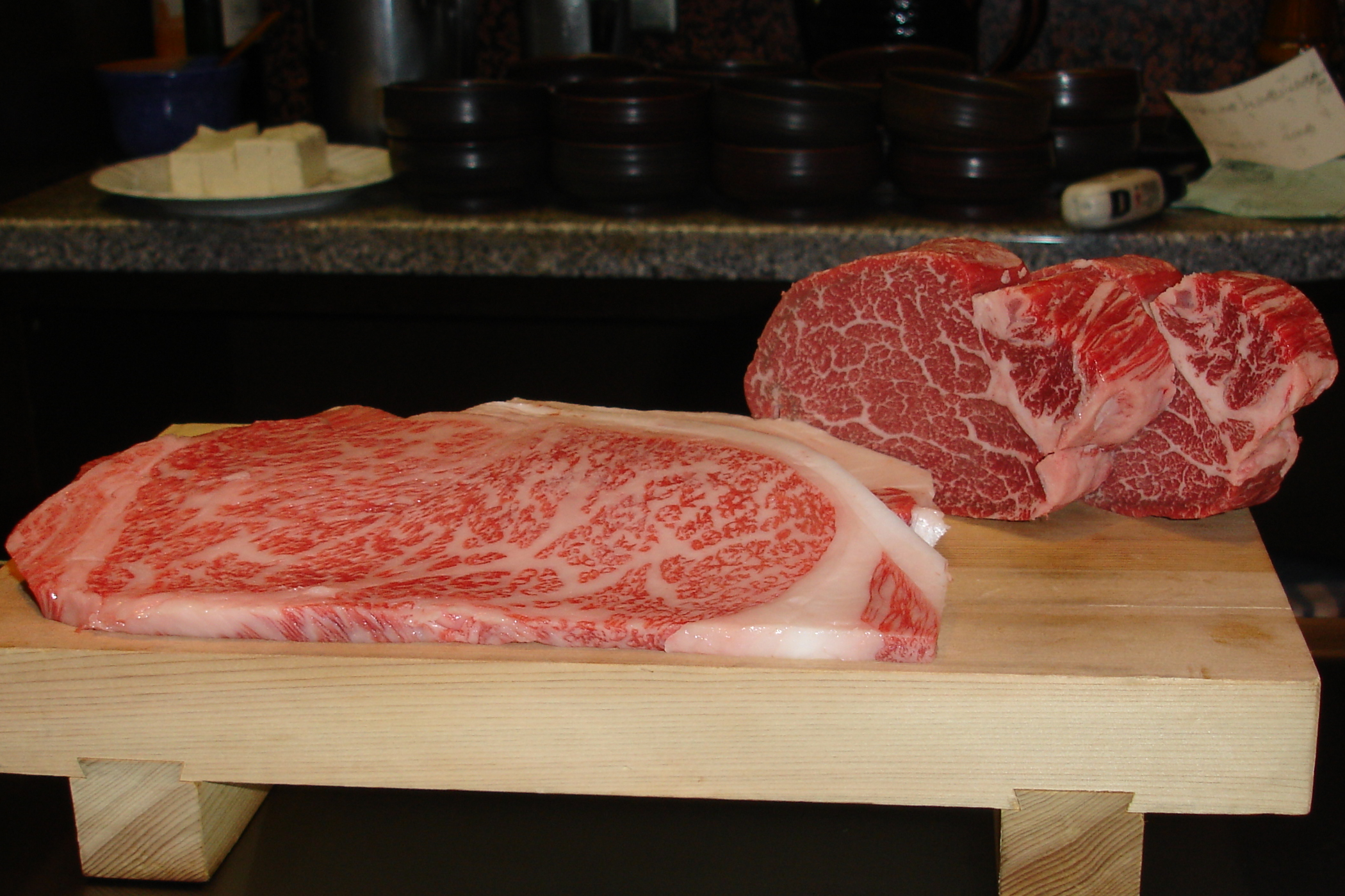
Kobe beef

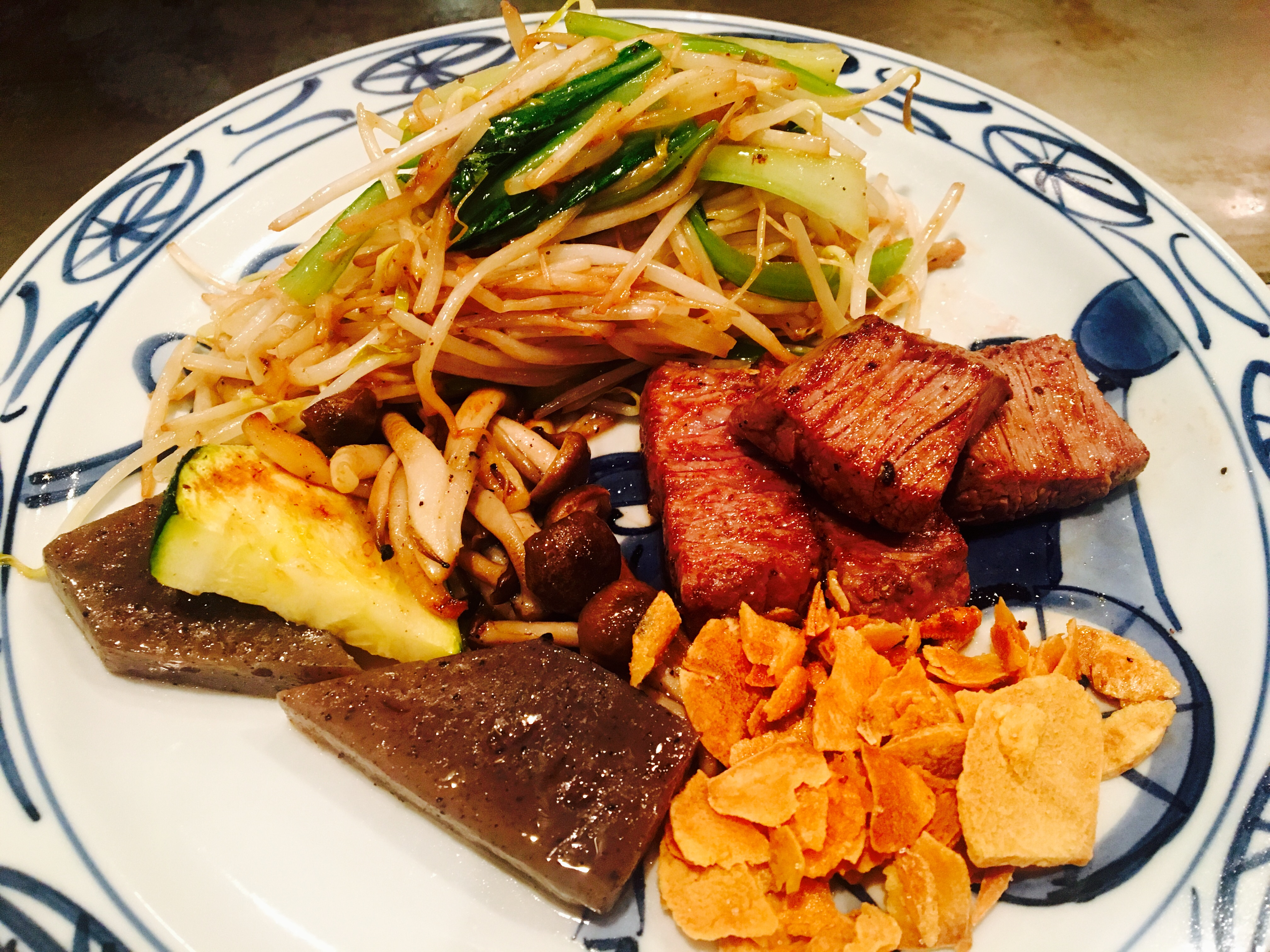
Kobe beef meal served in a steakhouse in Kobe

Kobe beef (神戸ビーフ, Kōbe bīfu) is Wagyu beef from the Tajima strain of Japanese Black cattle, raised in Japan's Hyōgo Prefecture around Kobe city, according to rules set out by the Kobe Beef Marketing and Distribution Promotion Association. The meat is a delicacy, valued for its flavour, tenderness and fatty, well-marbled texture. Kobe beef can be prepared as steak, sukiyaki, shabu-shabu, sashimi, and teppanyaki. Within Japan, Kobe is one of the three Sandai Wagyū, the "three big beefs", along with Matsusaka beef and Ōmi beef or Yonezawa beef.

Kobe beef is also called Kōbe-niku (神戸肉; "Kobe meat"), Kōbe-gyū or Kōbe-ushi (神戸牛; "Kobe cattle") in Japanese.

== History ==
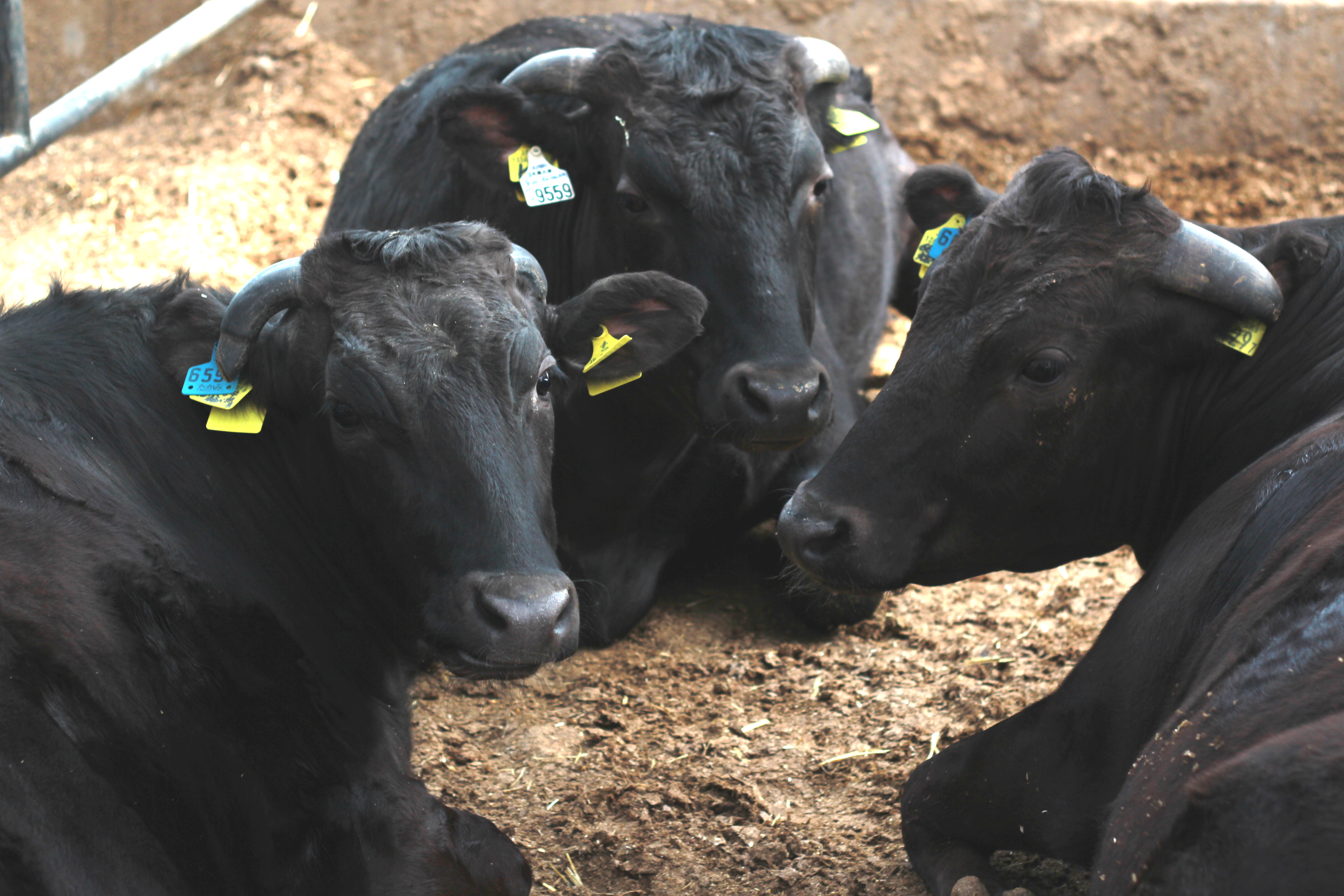
Tajima cattle on a Hyōgo farm

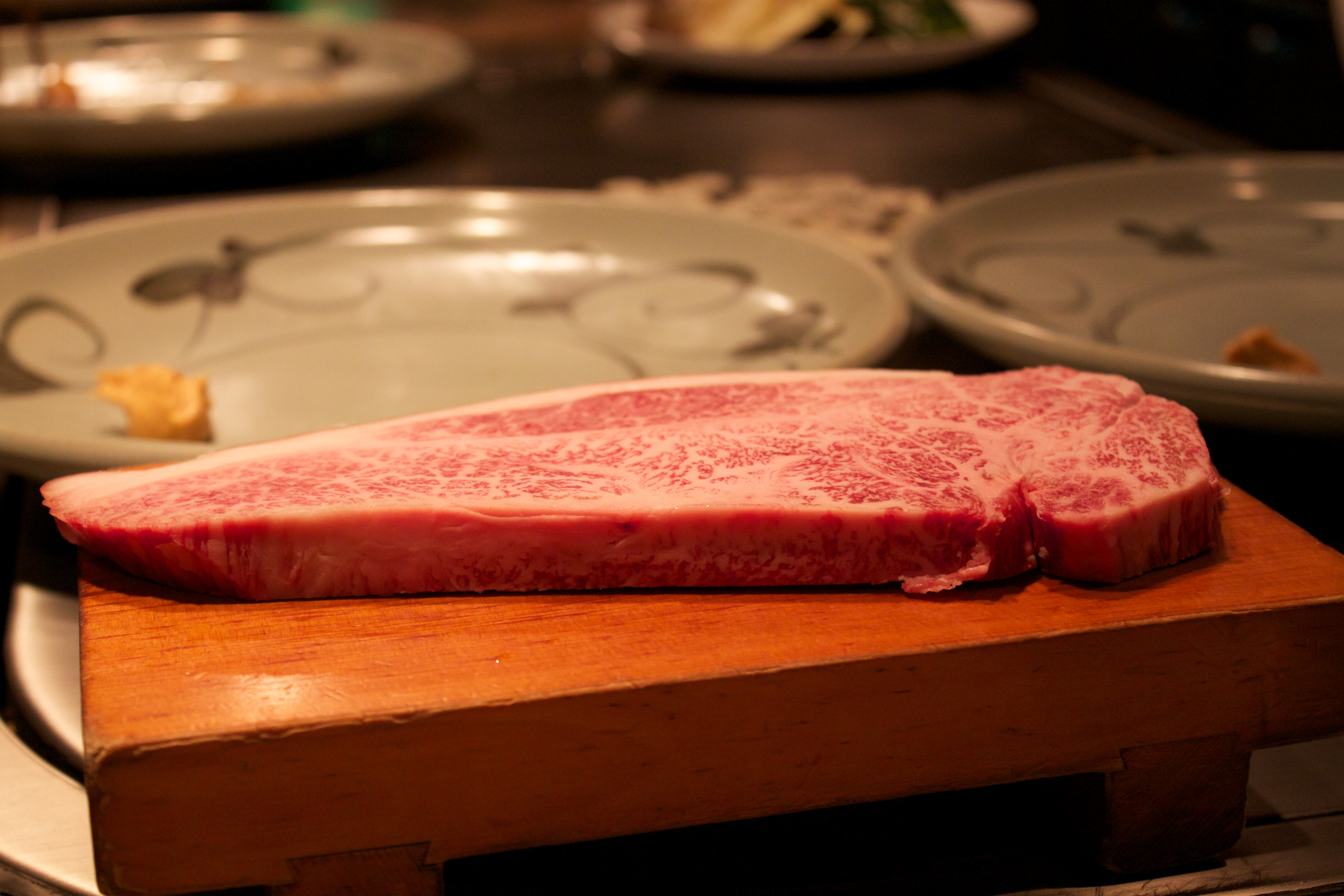
Kobe beef with marbling

Cattle were brought to Japan from China in about the second century AD, in the Yayoi period. Until about the time of the Meiji Restoration in 1868, they were used only as draught animals, in agriculture, forestry, mining and for transport, and as a source of fertiliser. Milk consumption was unknown, and – for cultural and religious reasons – meat was not eaten.

Japan was effectively isolated from the rest of the world from 1635 until 1854; there was no possibility of intromission of foreign genes to the cattle population during this time.

Between 1868, the year of the Meiji Restoration, and 1887, some 2,600 foreign cattle were imported, including Braunvieh, Shorthorn and Devon.

Between about 1900 and 1910, there was extensive cross-breeding of these with native stock. From 1919, the various heterogeneous regional populations that resulted from this brief period of cross-breeding were registered and selected as "Improved Japanese Cattle". Four separate strains were characterised, based mainly on which type of foreign cattle had most influenced the hybrids, and were recognised as breeds in 1944. These were the four wagyū breeds, the Japanese Black, the Japanese Brown, the Japanese Polled and the Japanese Shorthorn. The Tajima is a strain of the Japanese Black, the most populous breed (around 90% of the four breeds).

Beef consumption remained low until after World War II. Kobe beef grew in popularity and extended its global reach in the 1980s and 1990s.

In 1983, the Kobe Beef Marketing and Distribution Promotion Association was formed to define and promote the Kobe trademark. It sets standards for animals to be labeled as Kobe beef.

In 2009, the USDA placed a ban on the import of all Japanese beef to prevent the Japan foot-and-mouth outbreak from reaching US shores. The ban was relaxed in August 2012 and thereafter Kobe beef was imported into the US.

== Industry ==
Hyōgo prefecture, where authentic Kobe beef is produced

Kobe beef in Japan is a registered trademark of the Kobe Beef Marketing and Distribution Promotion Association (神戸肉流通推進協議会, Kōbeniku Ryūtsū Suishin Kyōgikai). It must fulfill all the following conditions:

- Tajima cattle born in Hyōgo Prefecture
- Farm feeding in Hyōgo Prefecture
- Heifer (a female that has not given birth) or bullock (steer or castrated bull)
- Processed at slaughterhouses in Kobe, Nishinomiya, Sanda, Kakogawa, or Himeji in Hyōgo Prefecture
- Marbling ratio, called BMS, of level 6 and above
- Meat quality score of 4 or 5, yield grade A or B
- Carcass weight of 499.9 kg or less.

The cattle are fed on grain fodder and brushed sometimes for setting fur. The melting point of fat of Kobe beef (Tajima cattle) is lower than common beef fat.

Kobe beef is expensive, partly because only about 3,000 head of cattle may qualify as Kobe per year, a form of artificial scarcity. In Japan, all cattle, including those approved as Kobe beef, can be tracked via a 10-digit number through every step of their entire life cycle.

== Outside Japan ==
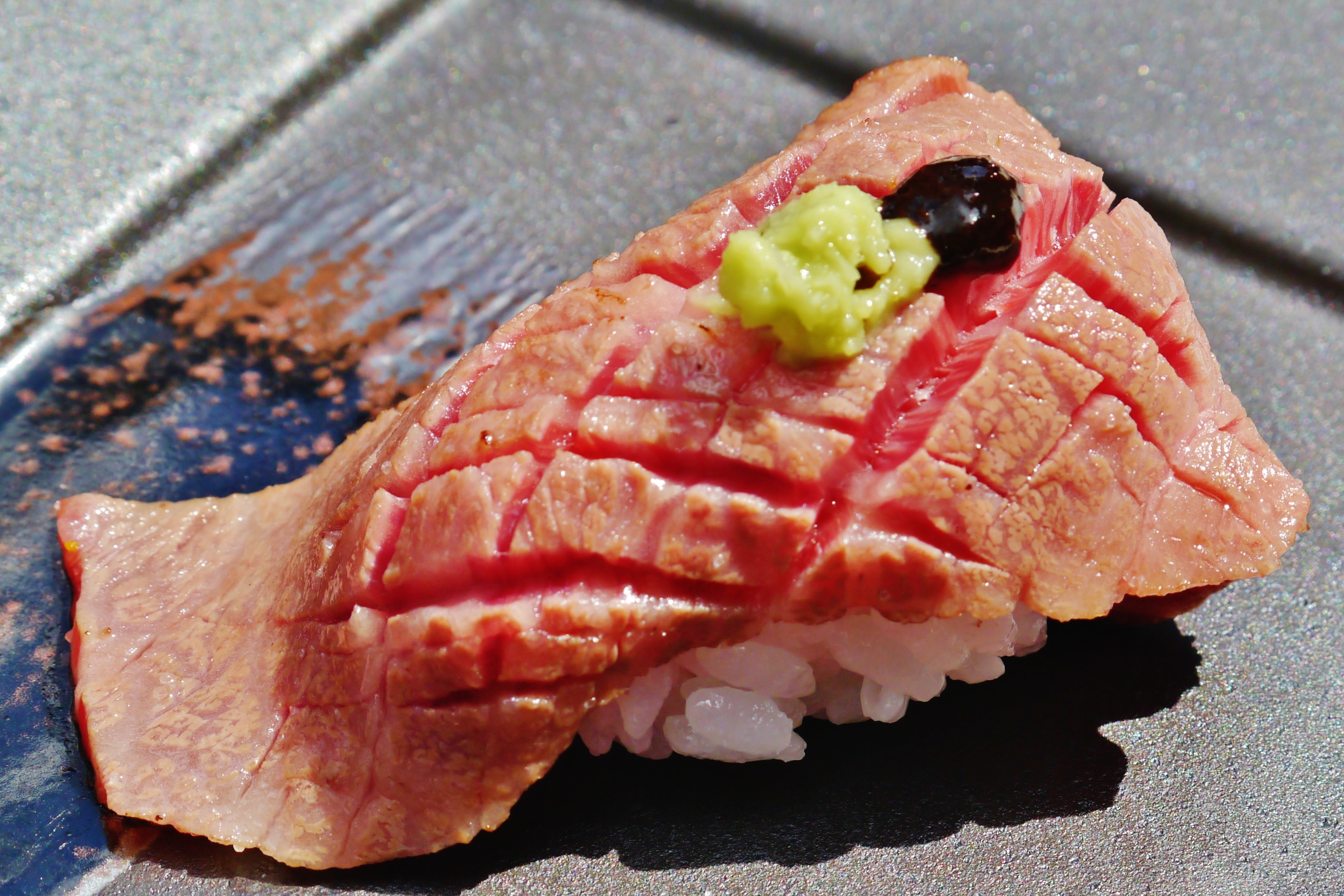
Kobe beef as sushi

Kobe beef was not exported until 2012. It was exported in January 2012 to Macau, then to Hong Kong in July 2012. Since then, exports have also been made to the United States, Singapore, Switzerland, Thailand, the United Kingdom and Canada.

In some countries, including Australia, Canada, New Zealand, the United Kingdom and the United States, Wagyu cattle imported from Japan are farmed, either purebred or cross-bred with other beef breeds such as Aberdeen Angus. In some places meat from these cattle may be marketed under names such as "Kobe-style beef"; it is not Kobe beef, and does not fulfil the requirements for certification of the authentic Japanese product. Due to a lack of legal recognition of the Kobe beef trademark in the United States, it is also possible to sell this meat as "Kobe beef". The Kobe Beef Marketing and Distribution Promotion Association planned to publish pamphlets about Kobe beef in foreign languages.

American "Kobe-style" beef tends to be darker and stronger-tasting than the authentic product. It may have more appeal to Western palates unfamiliar with the mild taste and high fat content of true Kobe beef.

== See also ==
- Akaushi
- Geographical indication
- Matsusaka beef
- Mishima beef
- Yonezawa beef
- Delicacy
