= Yonezawa beef =

Type of beef from Japan

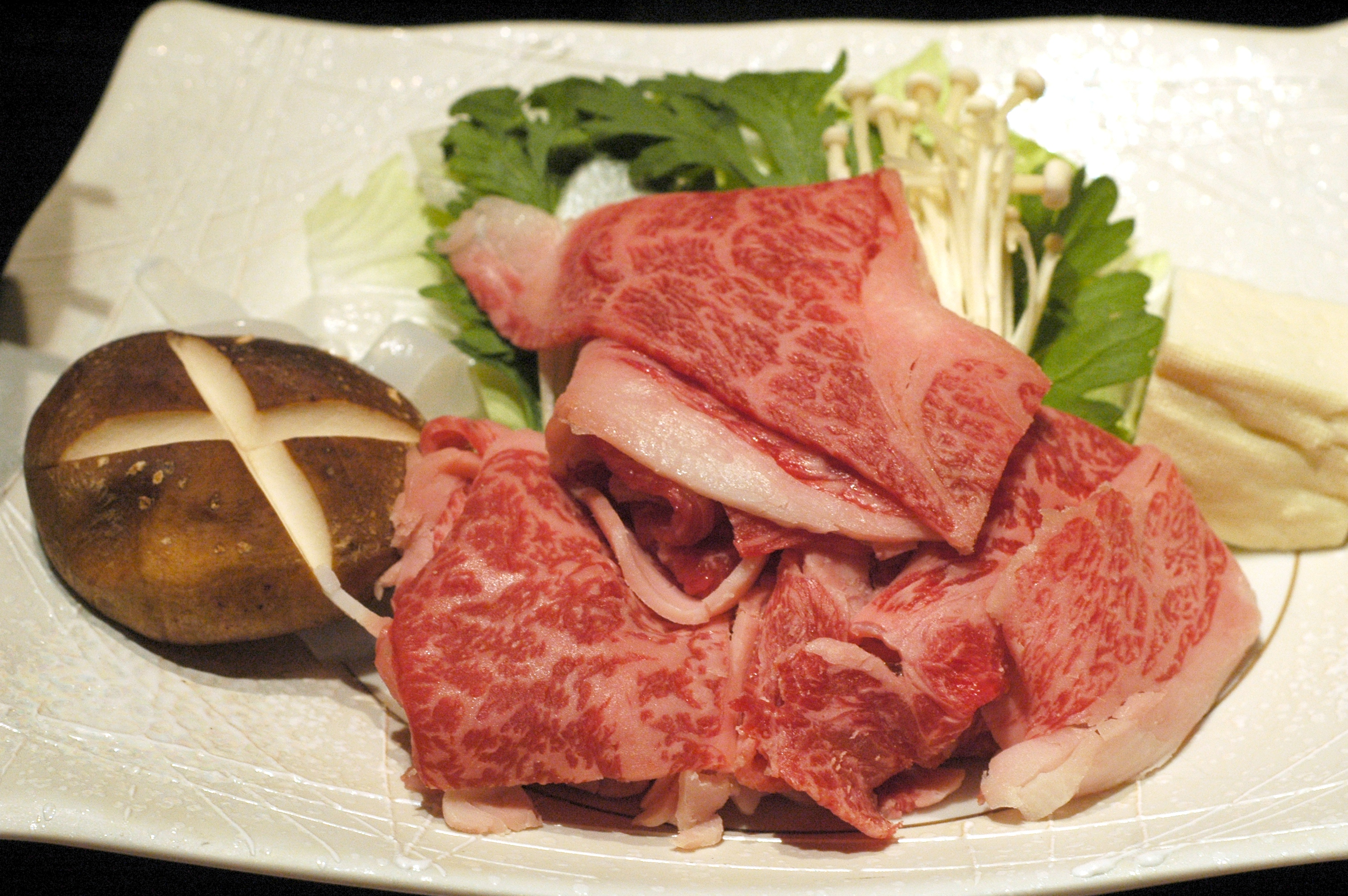

Yonezawa beef (米沢牛, Yonezawa gyū) is wagyū (Japanese beef) originating in the Yonezawa region of Yamagata Prefecture, Japan. Yamagata's government claims Yonezawa is considered one of the generally recognised three most famous beef brands in Japan, along with Kobe beef and Matsusaka beef, but Ōmi beef may have a better claim to this distinction.
