= Japanese Black =

Japanese breed of beef cattle

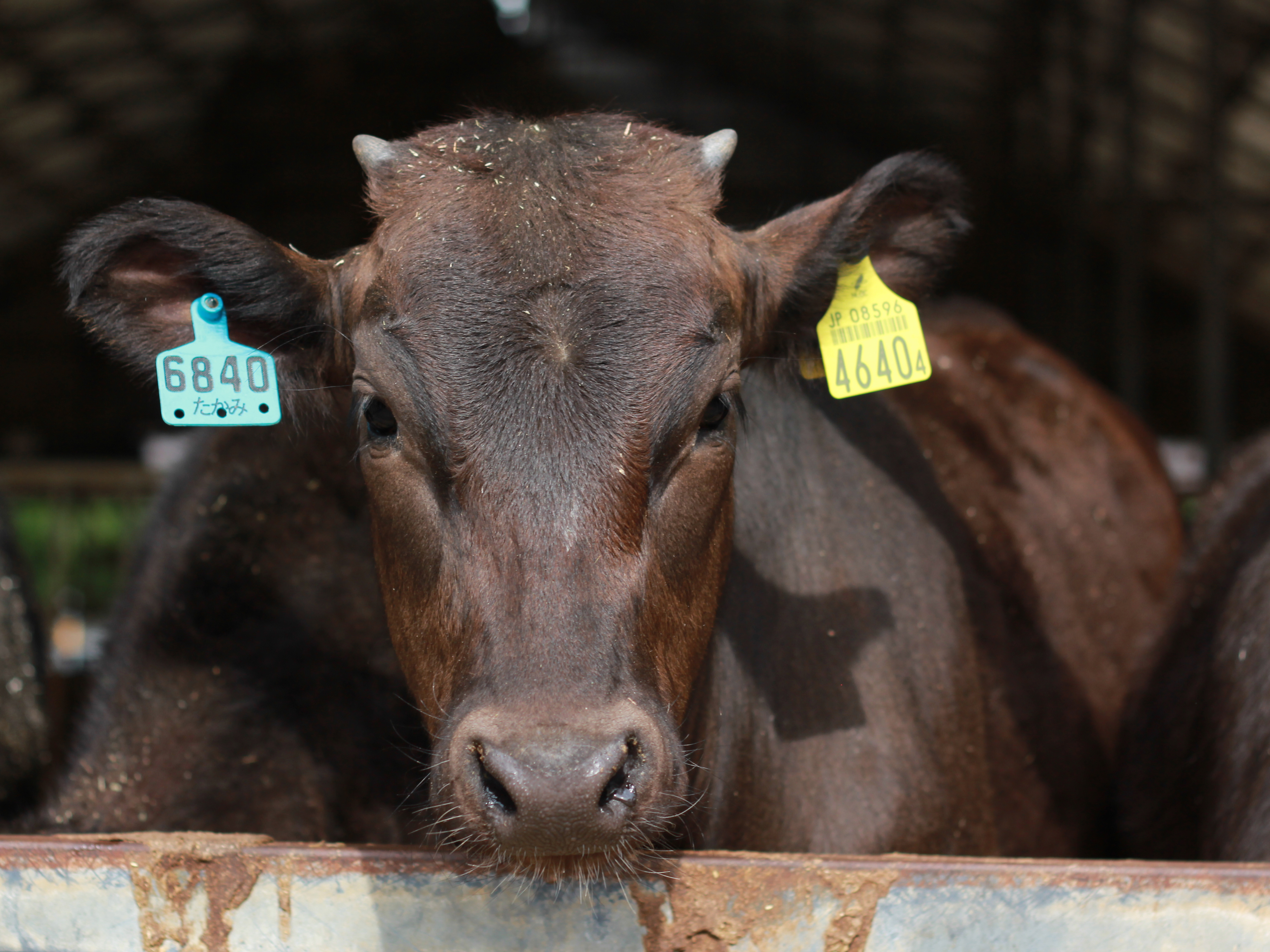
- Conservation status: FAO (2007): not at risk
- Other names: Japanese: 黒毛和種; Kuroge Washu; Kuro Ushi
- Country of origin: Japan
- Distribution: Kansai, Chūgoku, Shikoku, Kyūshū regions
- Use: meat

Traits
- Weight: Male: 809 kg; Female: 512 kg
- Height: Male: 145 cm; Female: 129 cm
- Coat: black
- Horn status: horned in both sexes

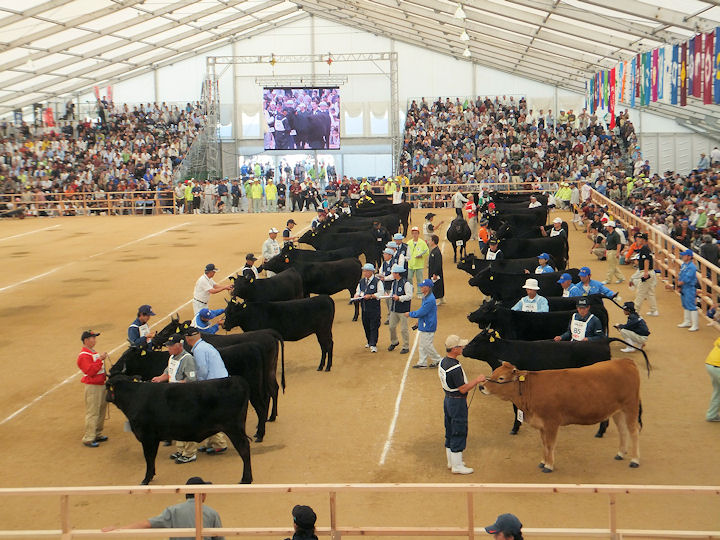
At a wagyū show in Sasebo, in Nagasaki Prefecture

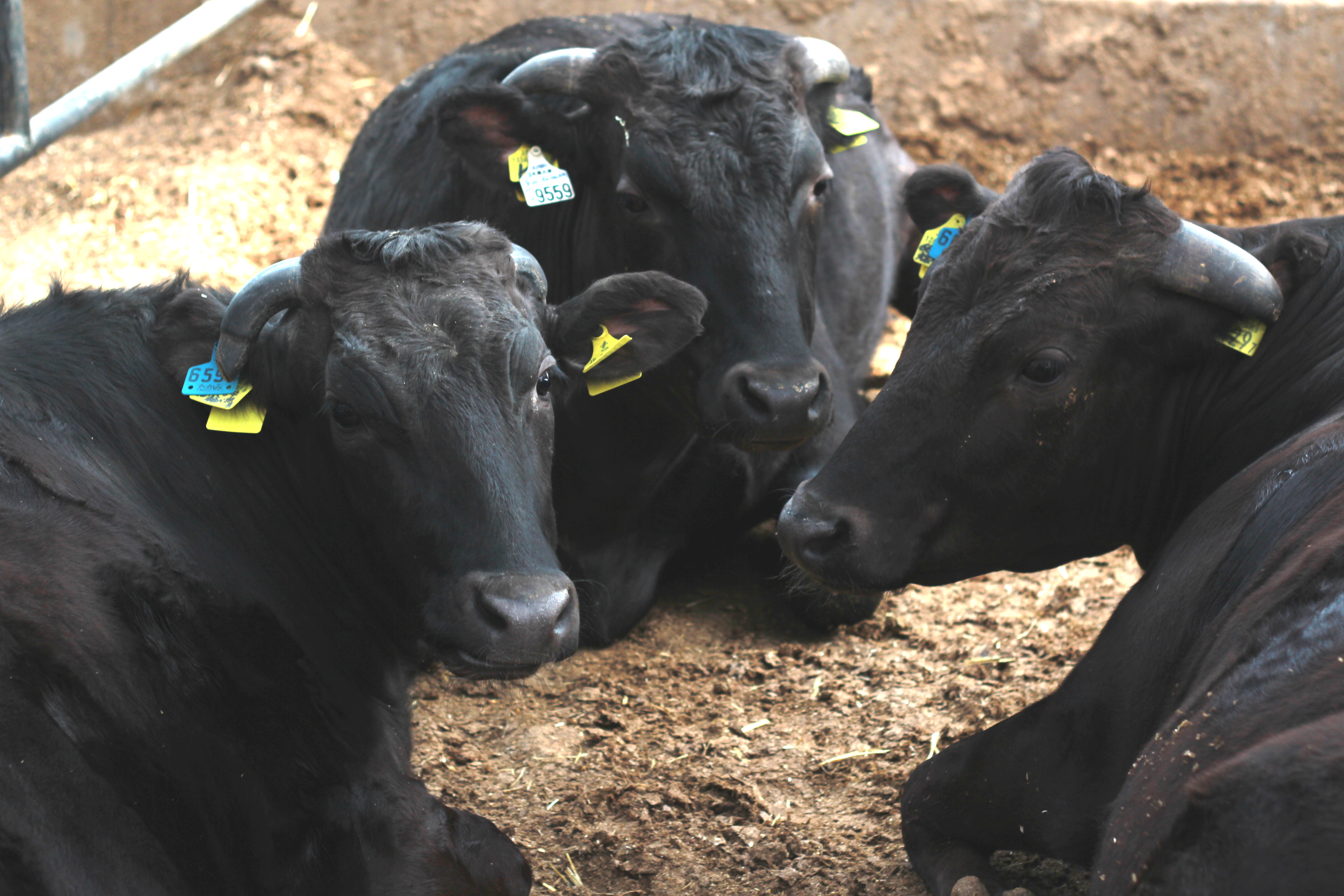
Cattle of the Tajima strain on a farm in northern Hyōgo Prefecture

The Japanese Black (Japanese: 黒毛和種, Kuroge Washu) is a Japanese breed of beef cattle. It is one of six native Japanese cattle breeds, and one of the four Japanese breeds known as wagyū, the others being the Japanese Brown, the Japanese Polled and the Japanese Shorthorn. All wagyū cattle derive from cross-breeding in the early twentieth century of native Japanese cattle with imported stock, mostly from Europe. In the case of the Japanese Black, the foreign influence was from European breeds including Braunvieh, Shorthorn, Devon, Simmental, Ayrshire and Friesian.

== History ==
Cattle were brought to Japan from China at the same time as the cultivation of rice, in about the second century AD, in the Yayoi period. Until about the time of the Meiji Restoration in 1868, they were used only as draught animals, in agriculture, forestry, mining and for transport, and as a source of fertiliser. Milk consumption was unknown, and – for cultural and religious reasons – meat was not eaten. Cattle were highly prized and valuable, too expensive for a poor farmer to buy.

Japan was effectively isolated from the rest of the world from 1635 until 1854; there was no possibility of intromission of foreign genes to the cattle population during this time. Between 1868, the year of the Meiji Restoration, and 1887, some 2600 foreign cattle were imported. At first there was little interest in cross-breeding these with native stock, but from about 1900 it became widespread. It ceased abruptly in 1910, when it was realised that, while the cross-breeds might be larger and have better dairy qualities, their working capacity and meat quality was lower. From 1919, the various heterogeneous regional populations that resulted from this brief period of cross-breeding were registered and selected as "Improved Japanese Cattle". Four separate strains were characterised, based mainly on which type of foreign cattle had most influenced the hybrids, and were recognised as breeds in 1944. These were the four wagyū breeds, the Japanese Black, the Japanese Brown, the Japanese Polled and the Japanese Shorthorn.

The Japanese Black developed in south-western Japan, in the prefectures of Kyoto and Hyogo in the Kansai region; of Hiroshima, Okayama, Shimane, Tottori and Yamaguchi in the Chūgoku region; of Kagoshima and Oita on the island of Kyūshū; and of Ehime on the island of Shikoku.

Among the European breeds which influenced its development were Braunvieh and Simmental cattle from Switzerland, Ayrshire, Devon and Shorthorn stock from the United Kingdom, and Friesian cattle from Germany and the Netherlands.

In 1960 the total breed population was reported to be over 1800000; in 2008 it was reported as about 707000. In 1999, the Japanese Black constituted approximately 93% of the national beef herd.

=== Tajima cattle ===
When registration of "Improved Japanese Cattle" began in 1919, there were notable variations between regional populations. It was left up to the prefectural administration to decide breed objectives. As a result, several different strains or sub-types developed with the Japanese Black population. One of these is the Tajima strain (Japanese: 但馬牛, Tajima Ushi or Tajima-gyu). Meat from animals of this strain only, raised only in Hyōgo Prefecture, may be approved for marketing as Kobe beef.
