= Ōmi beef =

Type of beef from Japan

Ōmi beef (近江牛, Ōmi ushi, Ōmi gyū) is a regional variety of wagyū (Japanese beef) originating in Shiga Prefecture, Japan. The Ōmi in “Ōmi beef” refers to Ōmi Province, the traditional name for the area which became Shiga prefecture. Ōmi beef is generally considered one of the three top brands of wagyū, along with Kobe beef and Matsusaka beef.

Ōmi beef is said to be the oldest beef brand in Japan. In the Azuchi–Momoyama period, Takayama Ukon, who was associated with Ōmi Province, treated the warlords to beef. In the Edo period, miso-marinated beef was sold and presented to the Tokugawa shogunate as a sustaining medicine by the Hikone Domain. In 1880s, Ōmi beef was sold as "Kobe beef" because it was shipped to Tokyo via Kobe Port. Since the completion of the Tōkaidō Main Line railway between Shiga and Tokyo, the "Ōmi beef" brand has gradually established itself as a brand distinct from Kobe beef.
