= Wagyu =

Principal Japanese breeds of beef cattle

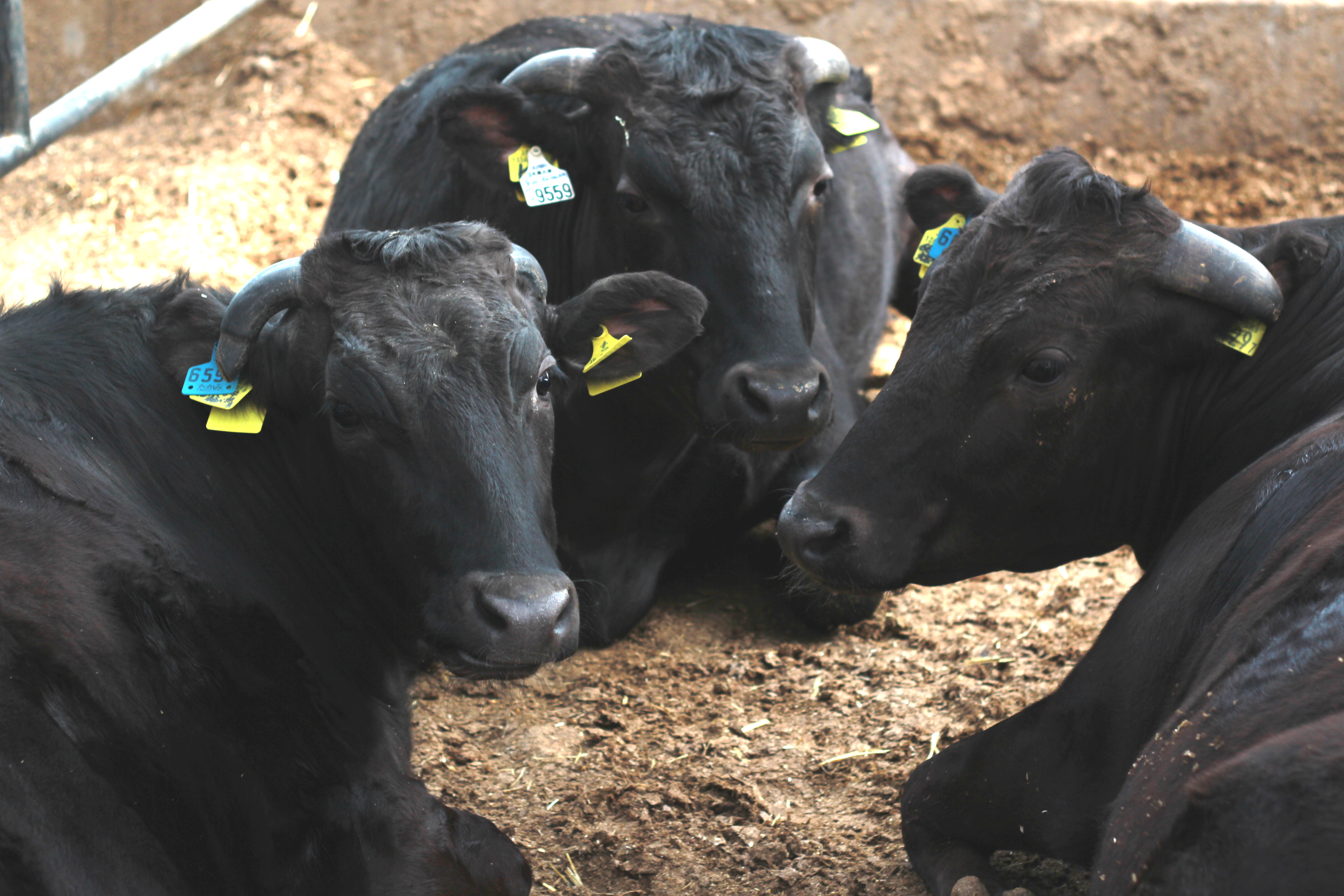
Japanese Black cattle of the Tajima strain on a farm in northern Hyōgo Prefecture

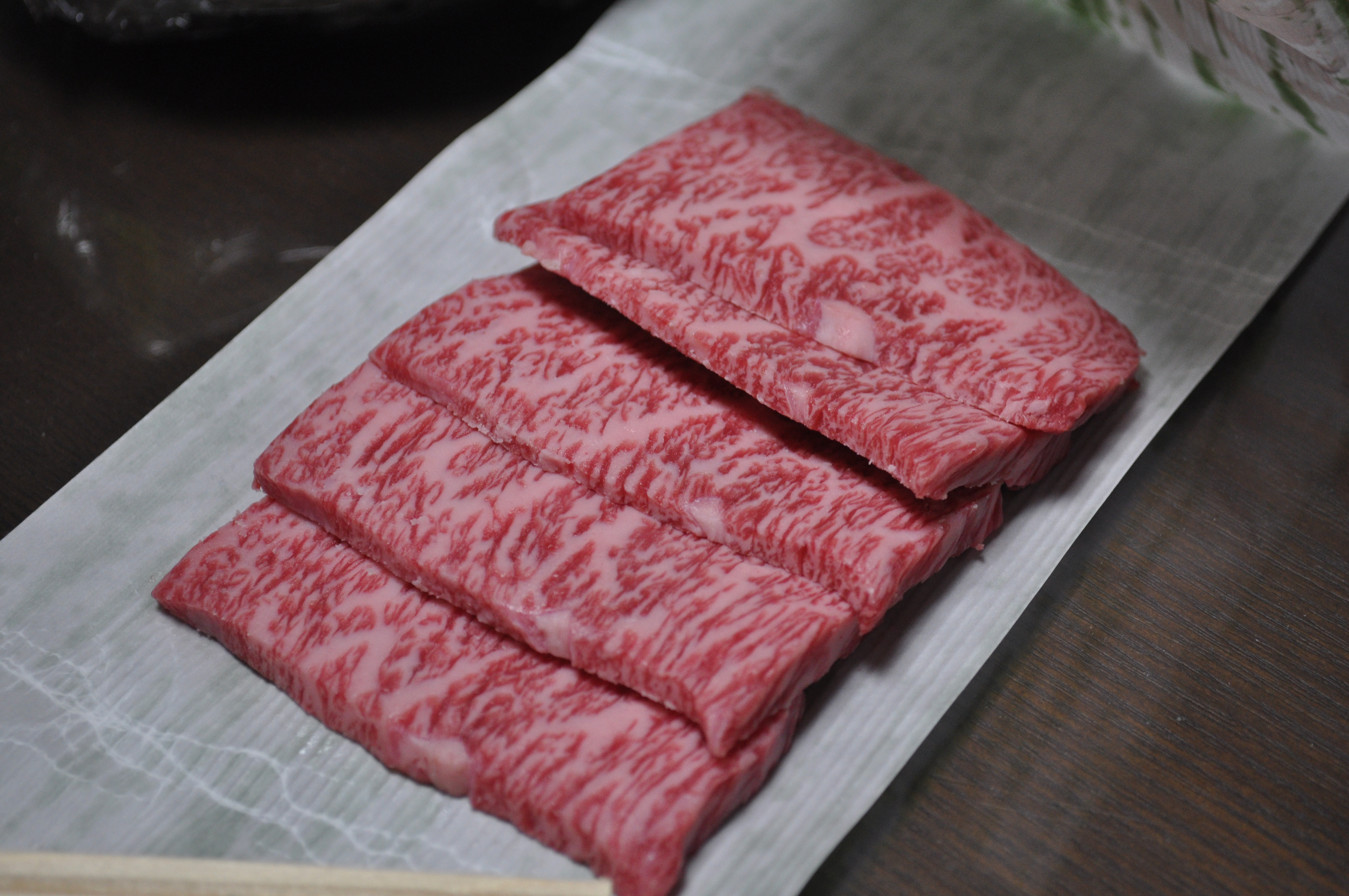
High-grade sliced Matsusaka wagyu beef

Wagyu (/ˈwɑːɡjuː/ WAH-gyoo; Japanese: 和牛, Hepburn: wagyū, lit. 'Japanese cattle') is the collective name for four established Japanese breeds of beef cattle: the Japanese Black, Japanese Brown, Japanese Polled, and Japanese Shorthorn. Historically, it was also used for native Japanese cattle; the surviving Mishima and Kuchinoshima cattle populations are not included among the four modern breeds.

Beginning in the late nineteenth century, these breeds were developed from regional native cattle crossed with imported stock. The timing of crossbreeding and the imported breeds involved varied by breed and region. The resulting cattle were later established as distinct breeds through selection and closed breeding.

The Japanese Black accounts for more than 90% of Wagyu cattle raised in Japan and is the main source of the highly marbled beef commonly associated with Wagyu. Its beef has finely distributed intramuscular fat known as sashi, a high proportion of monounsaturated fatty acids, and a distinctive sweet aroma that develops during cooking. The other three breeds generally produce less heavily marbled beef. Regional names such as Kobe beef, Matsusaka beef, Ōmi beef, and Yonezawa beef refer to brands defined by geographical origin and production or quality standards, not to additional cattle breeds. In Japan, beef carcasses are graded separately for meat yield and meat quality.

In Japan, labeling guidelines introduced in 2007 recommend that the designation Wagyu be used only for beef from cattle documented as one of the four breeds or specified crosses between them and confirmed as having been born and raised in Japan. Beginning in the 1970s, cattle and genetic material exported from Japan formed the basis of Wagyu herds in the United States and Australia. Breed associations in both countries maintain their own herdbooks and DNA-based parentage-verification systems, registering cattle according to their documented pedigree and proportion of Wagyu ancestry.

== Definition ==
The word Wagyu literally means "Japanese cattle" and does not denote a single breed. Before the modern breeds were established, Japan had regional populations of native cattle. After the Meiji Restoration in 1868, most were crossed for several generations with imported breeds, mainly British and continental European cattle. Two uncrossed native populations, the Mishima and Kuchinoshima cattle, survive and are considered to have remained free from European genetic influence.

In modern Japanese breed and meat classifications, Wagyu usually means four breeds: the Japanese Black, Japanese Brown, Japanese Polled, and Japanese Shorthorn. Beginning in the late nineteenth century, these breeds developed from regional native cattle crossed with imported stock. The imported breeds used differed by breed and region. The resulting cattle were later established as distinct breeds through selection and closed breeding.

After bovine spongiform encephalopathy (BSE) was first confirmed in Japan in 2001, the Beef Traceability Law was enacted in 2003. The system assigns each animal a ten-digit identification number and records its birth and movements; it applies to all cattle in Japan, not only Wagyu. This system is also used to verify the labeling requirements introduced for Wagyu beef in 2007. Under guidelines issued by the Ministry of Agriculture, Forestry and Fisheries, the designation Wagyu is recommended only for beef from cattle documented as one of the four breeds or specified crosses between them and confirmed as having been born and raised in Japan. Breed identity is established through breed-registration records, while birthplace and rearing history are checked through the traceability system.

This Wagyu designation is narrower than the Japanese origin category "domestic beef" (国産牛, kokusan-gyū), which generally applies when the animal was raised in Japan for longer than in any other country. Domestic beef therefore includes qualifying Wagyu as well as beef from Western-derived dairy breeds such as Holstein and Jersey, and from crosses between dairy and beef cattle. Beef from these dairy breeds and dairy–Wagyu crosses may be sold as domestic beef but does not qualify as Wagyu.

Wagyu herds were also established outside Japan from cattle and genetic material exported beginning in the 1970s, particularly in the United States and Australia. Registered cattle in both countries include fullblood animals descended entirely from Japanese foundation stock as well as animals crossbred with other breeds. Breed associations maintain separate registers for these categories and use documented pedigrees, Wagyu ancestry percentages, and DNA parentage testing to determine registration. These are cattle-registration systems, whereas the Japanese guideline applies to the labeling of beef and also includes domestic birth and rearing requirements.

== Origin ==
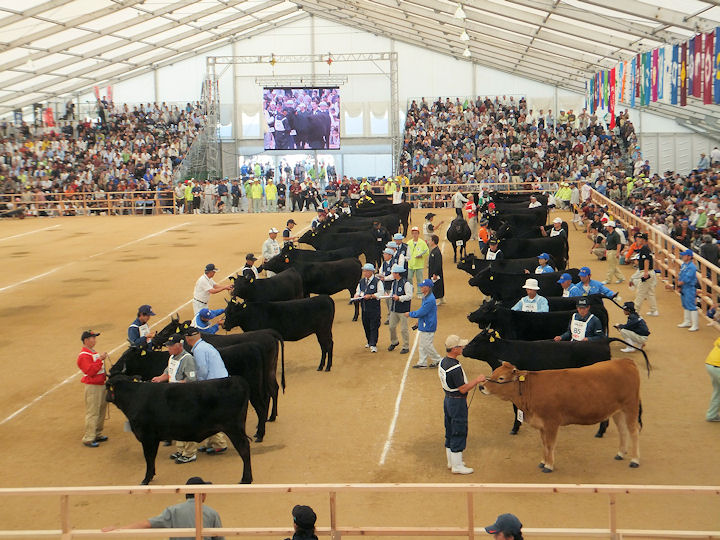
Wagyu show in Sasebo, Japan

In 1927, fossils of an ancient wild species of cow, Hanaizumi Moriushi (Leptobison hanaizumiensis), dating from the Paleolithic period about 20,000 years ago, were discovered at the Hanaizumi Site in Ichinoseki City, Iwate Prefecture. The Hanaizumi Moriushi is a species similar to the bison and is said to be close to the steppe bison (Bison priscus) lineage. Fossil bones of Aurochs (Bos primigenius) have also been found in Ichinoseki City. Since Hokkaido and Honshu were land-locked with the Eurasian continent during the Ice Age, these animals came from the continent via Hokkaido.

In addition, projectile points made from polished wild cattle bones have been found at the same site, although in small quantities, suggesting that humans existed during this period and that Hanaizumi Moriushi and aurochs were hunted.

At the Ohama Site in Goto City, Nagasaki Prefecture, cattle teeth dating to the middle Yayoi period were excavated. Among them were also processed cattle molars. However, this excavation was controversial because it contradicted the statement in Chen Shou's Records of the Three Kingdoms (Wajinden) that there were no cattle or horses in Japan. Later, radiocarbon dating of the excavated cattle molars yielded a date of around 40 AD (±90 years).

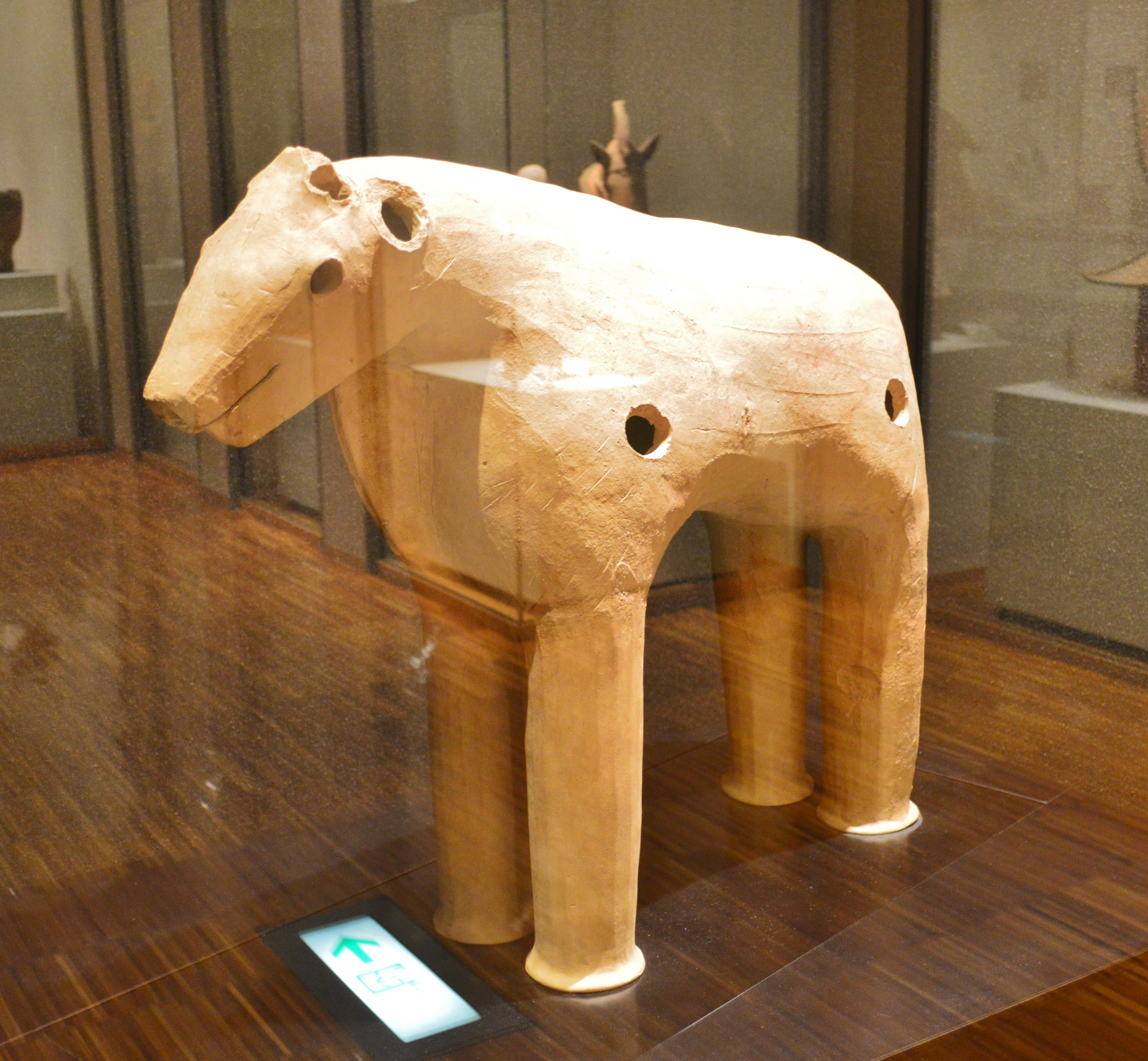
Cow-shaped haniwa

Wagyu Prefectures
1 Miyazaki Prefecture
2 Hokkaido
3 Kagoshima Prefecture
4 Shiga Prefecture
5 Kumamoto Prefecture
6 Hyōgo Prefecture
7 Kagawa Prefecture
8 Miyagi Prefecture
9 Gifu Prefecture
10 Gunma Prefecture
11 Saitama Prefecture
12 Oita Prefecture
13 Okayama Prefecture
14 Tottori Prefecture

However, some in the Japanese archaeological community remain skeptical about the presence of cattle in Japan during the Yayoi period, and there is a persistent view that they were brought to Japan from the Korean peninsula by the toraijin, a group of people who came to Japan in the mid-5th century during the Kofun period. At the Nango-Ōhigashi site in Gose City, Nara Prefecture, excavations revealed cow bones believed to date back to the 5th century. At the Funamiya Kofun Tumulus (late 5th century) in Asago City, Hyōgo Prefecture, pieces of a cow-shaped haniwa (clay figurine), believed to be the oldest in Japan, have been excavated. In addition, a cow-shaped haniwa was excavated from the Hashida No. 1 Tumulus in Tawaramoto Town, Shiki-gun, Nara Prefecture in the first half of the 6th century, and was designated as an Important Cultural Property of Japan in 1958.

On the other hand, recent genetic studies have shown that Wagyu and Korean cattle (Hanwoo and others) differ greatly in their genetic information. Livestock cattle are divided into two major lineages: northern lineage cattle (Bos taurus) and Indian lineage cattle (Bos indicus), and both Wagyu and Korean cattle belong to the northern lineage and do not contain Indian lineage such as Zebu cattle.

However, in terms of mitochondrial DNA haplogroups, haplogroup T4 (East Asian type) is predominant in the Wagyu (Japanese Black) at about 65%, while haplogroup T3 (European type) is predominant in Korean cattle at 66–83%.

T4 is a haplogroup unique to East Asia that is not observed in Near Eastern, European, and African cattle, and T3 is the predominant haplogroup in European cattle, but T3 is also predominant in Korean cattle. This means that the present breed of Korean cattle is not the main ancestor of the Wagyu.

In addition, haplogroup P has additionally been detected in about 46% of the Japanese Shorthorn. It has been detected in many extinct European aurochs, but has only been found in a total of three current livestock cattle—one Chinese and two Korean—out of several thousand individuals in the database.

The Japanese Shorthorn was created by crossing the Nanbu cattle bred in the former Nanbu Domain territory in northeastern Japan (present-day Iwate Prefecture) with Shorthorns and other breeds imported from the United States, but P has not been detected in Shorthorns and is thought to be derived from the Nanbu cattle.

Fossils of Hanaizumi Moriushi and Aurochs have been found in Iwate Prefecture, but it is unclear if the Nanbu cattle were related to these. Haplogroup P has also been found in Chinese and Korean cattle, but it is extremely rare compared to T4. Therefore, it is suggested that the ancestors of the Nanbu cattle have a different origin from the ancestors of the Japanese Black in western Japan, where T4 is abundant, and that there is no single ancestor of the Wagyu.

== History ==
Cattle were brought to Japan from the Korean Peninsula or China, but archaeological and genetic studies have proposed different dates for their arrival, ranging from around the turn of the era to the 5th century.

=== Nara period (710–794) ===
In 675, due to the influence of Buddhism, Emperor Tenmu issued a decree banning meat eating, and eating cattle was officially prohibited in Japan. However, a study of human excrement excavated from the Heijo Palace site has revealed that Japanese people in the Nara period (710–794) continued to eat cattle even after the prohibition. In addition, the Yoro Code (757) stipulates that when a government-owned horse or ox dies, it should be dismembered and the skin, brain, horns, and gall bladder removed, and if there is calculus bovis (gallstones), it should be delivered to the state. The Yoro Code also includes provisions for the sale of the hides and meat of horses and cattle, and there were distribution channels throughout Japan for buying and selling these items during the Nara period.

=== Heian and Kamakura periods (794–1333) ===
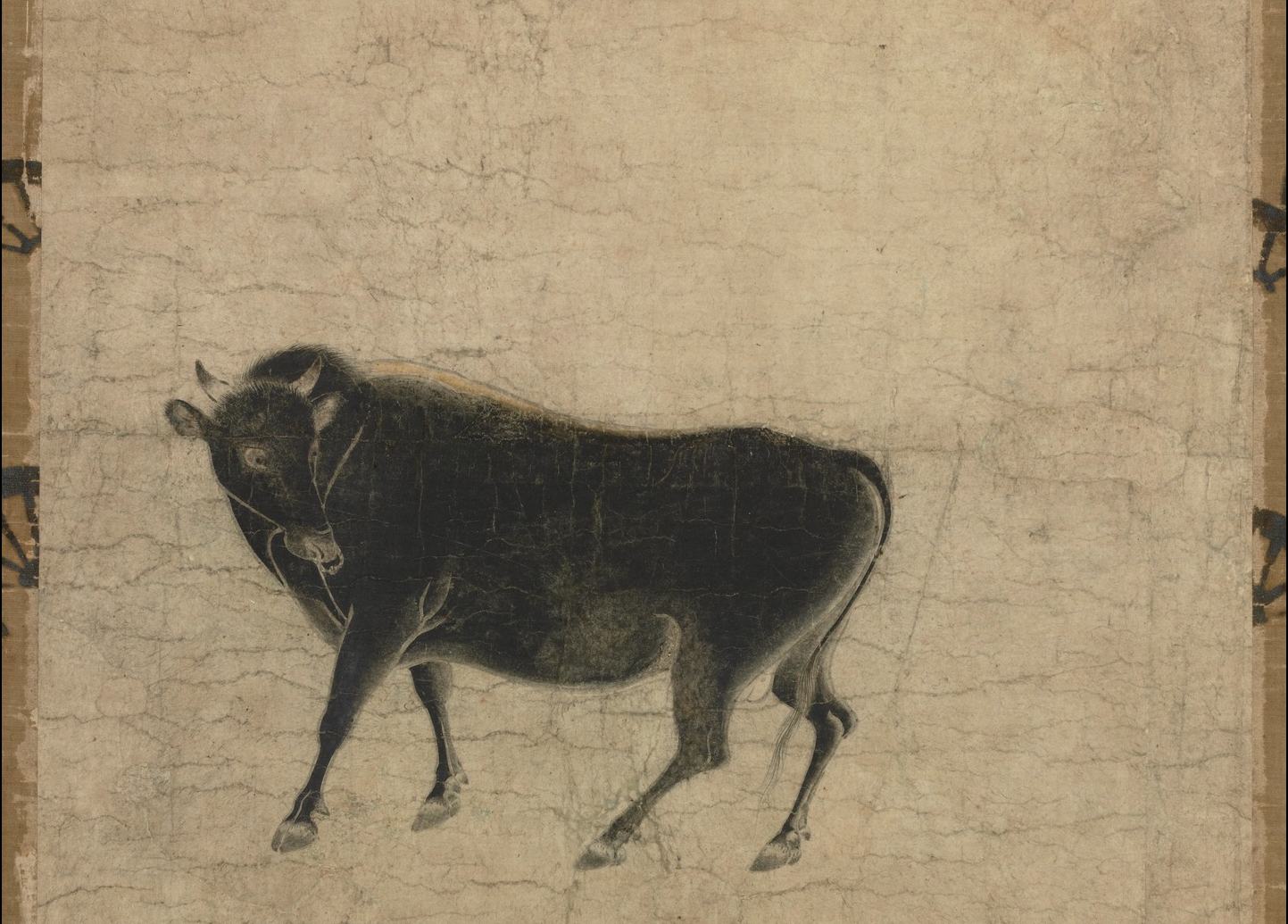
Swift Bull, by Fujiwara no Yukimitsu. Kamakura period, 13th century

During the Heian period (794 – 1185), the main use of cattle was for bullock carts. Cattle that excelled in this use were called sun-gyū (駿牛, swift bulls) and were regarded as excellent bulls. Owning such an excellent bull became a source of pride for the aristocrats of Japan at that time.

The "Pictorial Record of Swift Bulls" (駿牛絵詞) which is believed to have been written around 1279, is said to be the world's oldest specialized book on bulls. In the same book, the names of 52 bulls are listed as swift bulls. At the time, the cattle from Iki Island in present-day Nagasaki Prefecture had the highest reputation as swift bulls, but they were temporarily destroyed by the Mongolian army during the Mongolian invasion, which killed them and used them as food.

From the Kamakura period (1185–1333) to the Muromachi period (1336–1573), farming using cattle and horses became popular mainly in western Japan, contributing greatly to the development of agriculture. In a complaint by a farmer in 1423, describing the wrongdoing of a manor administrator, it mentions that the farmer owned cattle and used them for farming.

=== Edo period (1603–1867) ===
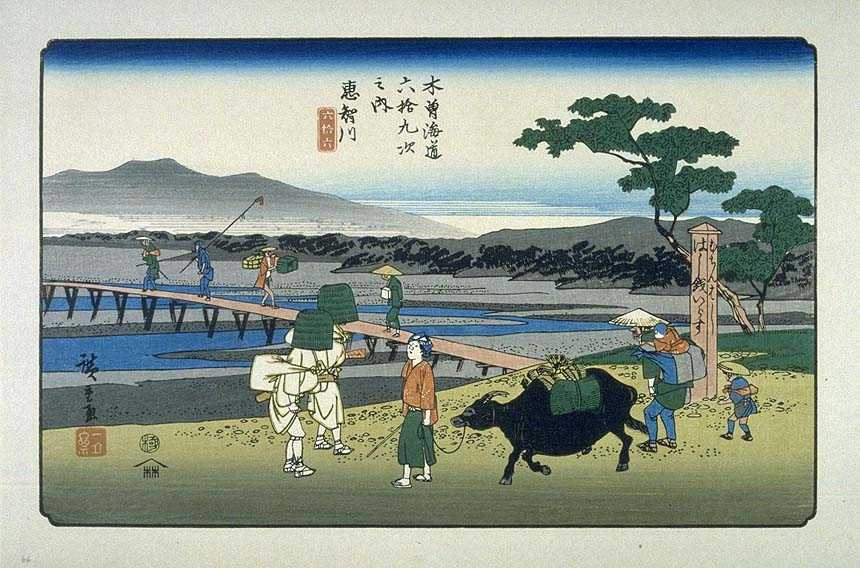
Wagyu depicted in Ukiyo-e. From "The Sixty-nine Stations of the Kiso Kaidō" by Hiroshige Utagawa.

Until about the time of the Meiji Restoration in 1868, cattle were used only as draught animals, in agriculture, forestry, mining and transport, and as a source of fertilizer. Milk consumption was unknown, and – for cultural and religious reasons – meat was not eaten. Cattle were highly prized and valuable, too expensive for a poor farmer to buy.

Japan was effectively isolated from the rest of the world from 1635 until 1854; there was no possibility of the intromission of foreign genes to the cattle population during this time.

In western Japan during the Edo period (1603–1867), superior cattle were produced by aggressive inbreeding, and the superior bloodlines were called "tsuru" (蔓, lit. 'vine'), and cattle with superior bloodlines (tsuru-ushi, lit. 'vine cattle') were traded at high prices. Famous tsuru include the Takenotani tsuru (Okayama Prefecture), Bokura tsuru (Shimane Prefecture), Iwakura tsuru (Hiroshima Prefecture), and Shusuke tsuru (Hyōgo Prefecture). In Japan, where meat eating was frowned upon and the use of milk was not widespread, cows in the Edo period were primarily work cattle that plowed the fields, so a good cow in this period meant one that was healthy and obedient.

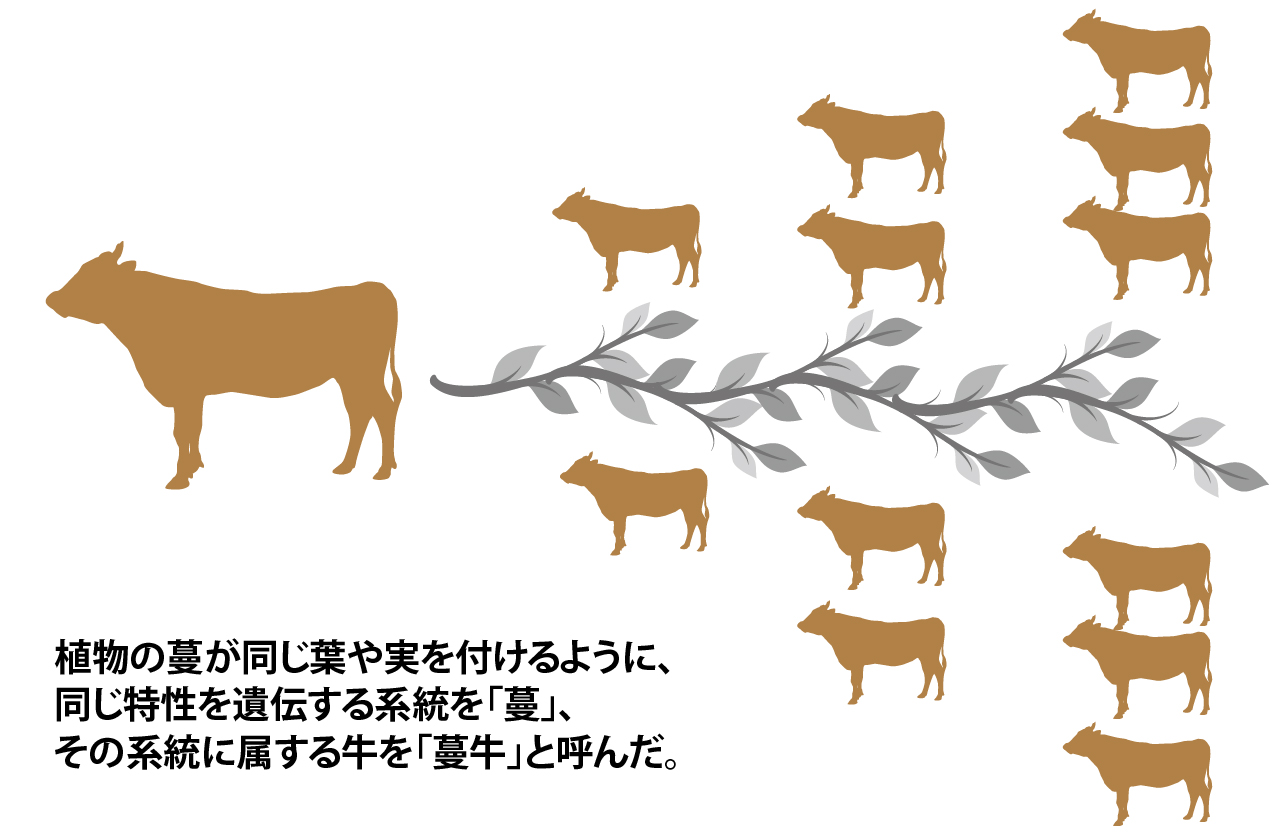
Image of "tsuru" and "tsuru-ushi"

The famous "Tajiri-go" bull was born from the "Atsuta tsuru," which is a descendant of the Shusuke tsuru. According to a survey conducted by the Japan Wagyu Registry Association, the pedigree was traced from a database of 718,969 Japanese black cattle mothers registered in Japan, and it was found that 718,330 or 99.9% of them are descended from the Tajiri-go.

On the other hand, there are those who are concerned about the current situation in which only the Tajima cattle line represented by the Tajiri-go is spreading and genetic diversity is being lost from Wagyu, and the movement to revive the Takenotani tsuru has been attracting attention in recent years.

In 1859, Japan opened the port of Yokohama in accordance with the demands of Western nations. At the same time, a foreign settlement was established in Yokohama. Foreign residents sought cattle for meat from neighboring villages but were refused, so cattle were imported from the U.S., China, and Korea, which gradually became unable to meet the demand.

In 1865, before the Port of Kobe was opened, the Hyogo Port Opening Demand Incident occurred, in which nine warships from Britain, France, the Netherlands, and the United States invaded Hyogo Port demanding its opening. At that time, sailors negotiated with local cattle merchants for cattle, which were initially slaughtered on board, but as demand increased, it became necessary to slaughter them on land. 1866 saw the first slaughter of cattle by foreigners in the pine forests of Cape Wadamisaki. In this way, foreign ships bought 30 or 40 cows at a time in Kobe before the official opening of the port and brought them to Yokohama, where "Kobe beef" (actually Tajima beef) became well known for its delicious taste.

=== Modern times ===
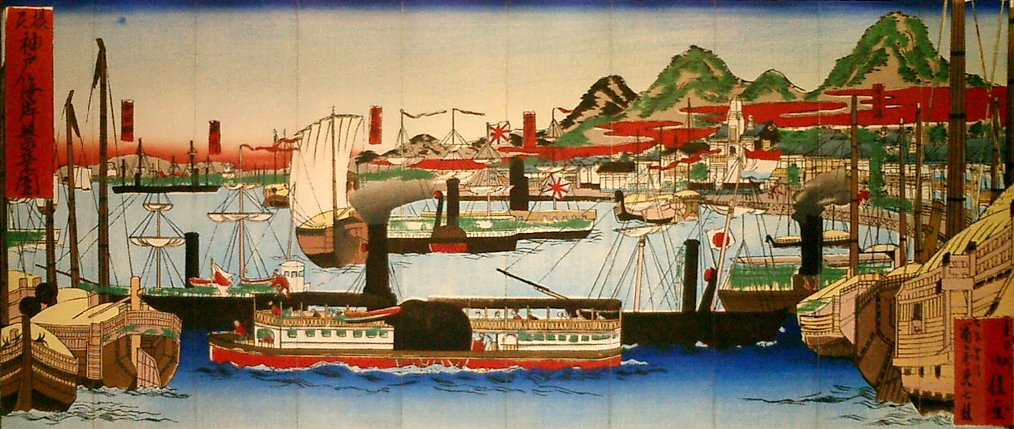
Ukiyo-e depicting the Port of Kobe after its opening

In January 1868, when the new port of Kobe opened east of Hyogo Port, the Kobe foreign settlement was established. In 1868, Englishman Edward Charles Kirby established the first slaughterhouse in Kobe, and in 1869, a sukiyaki restaurant called "Gekka-tei" opened there.

According to a newspaper article in 1875, Kobe was the first place where meat eating was popular, with 800 cows slaughtered in a month. Next was Yokohama with 600, followed by Tokyo with 500, and Osaka and Nagoya with 300.

The reputation of Wagyu beef as having a superior taste spread from the residents of the foreign settlement to the Japanese, and it was written in books of the time that "Wagyu beef has a better taste than foreign beef" and "there has never been beef as good as Kobe's beef".

At the same time, however, it was also believed that Wagyu were superior to Western breeds for plowing use but inferior in milk and meat production, and their improvement was urgently needed.

Between 1868, the year of the Meiji Restoration, and 1887, some 2600 foreign cattle were imported. At first, there was little interest in cross-breeding these with the native stock, but from about 1900, it became widespread.

In 1900, the Japanese government established a committee to investigate the improvement of cattle breeding, and began a systematic crossbreeding program between Wagyu and Western breeds. The Ayrshire and Simmental breeds were imported first, followed by the Brown Swiss, but few people wanted to crossbreed with them because of their large size, and the Japanese government encouraged it, but the crossbreds were very unpopular.

The crossbreds' oversized stature made them inconvenient for Japan's narrow arable land, and their movements were slow and sluggish, and their temperaments were rough and lacking in obedience. They also had poor meat quality and were condemned from all quarters as being unsuitable for sukiyaki. As a result, from around 1907, there were no more crossbreds being bred, and in reaction, the old black cattle were considered good, and as long as they were small and black, they could be sold.

As crossbreeding with Western breeds progressed, the term "pure Wagyu" (純粋和牛, junsui Wagyū) emerged to describe native Japanese cattle, and by 1912, it was claimed that there were two definitions of Wagyu: "pure Wagyu" and "improved Wagyu" (改良和牛, kairyō Wagyū).

At that time, Mendel's laws had just been rediscovered, and both the Japanese government and cattle farmers lacked sufficient knowledge of genetics. The unpopularity of crossbred cattle led to the Japanese government's decision in 1911 to suspend plans to purchase Brown Swiss and Simmental cattle. In 1912, the Japanese government decided to formally end its policy of encouraging crossbreeding by announcing that crossbreeding between Wagyu and European breeds had been sufficiently successful. From then on, Wagyu improvement was based on pure Wagyu and improved Wagyu (crossbred cattle).

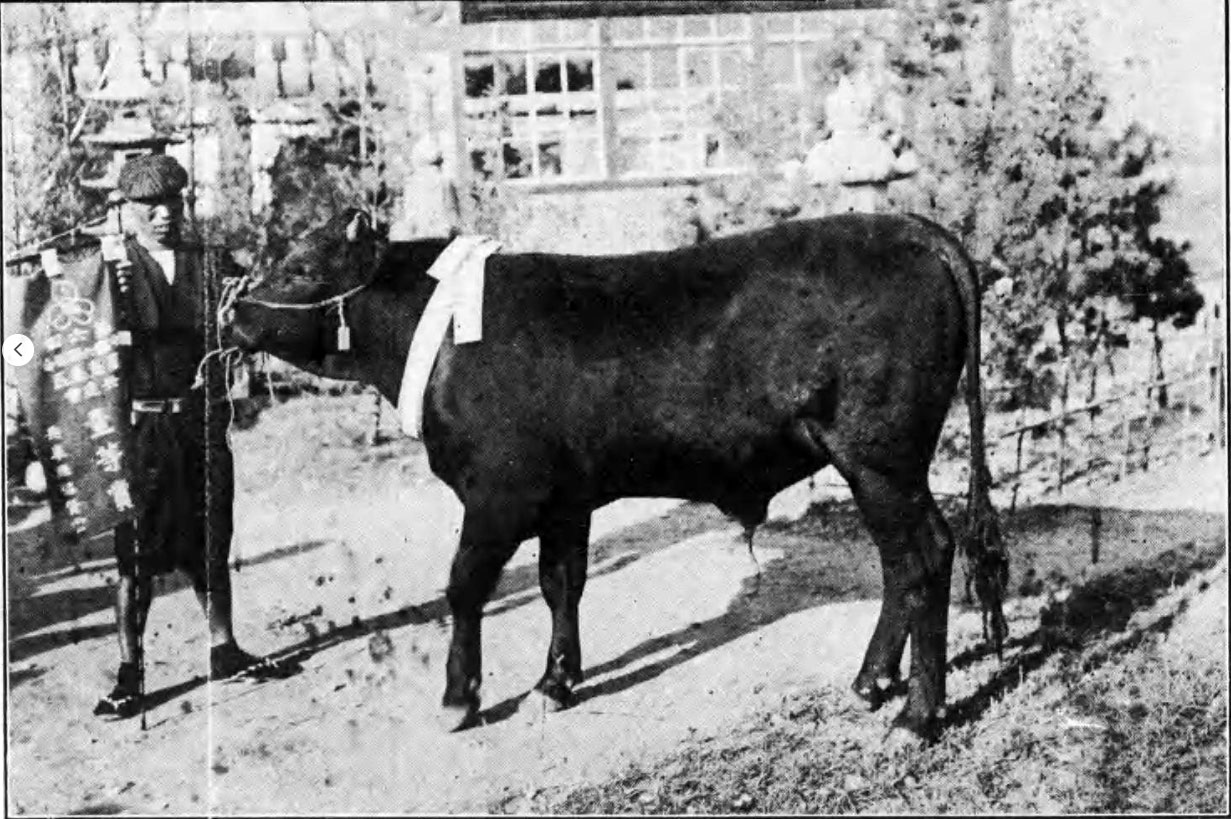
"Fukutomi-go," one of the first Improved Japanese Breeds to win the first prize (1912)

In October 1912, when the 6th Chugoku Six Prefectures United Livestock Breeders' Show was held in Himeji City, Hyōgo Prefecture, two crossbred bulls won first prize as "Improved Japanese Breed" (改良和種, kairyō washu) and the term "Improved Japanese Breed" came into use thereafter. Thereafter, organized breeding efforts to increase the number of superior Wagyu cattle began.

According to a survey conducted in 1914, there were 61 different breeds of Wagyu in Japan at that time, including Tajima cattle, Iwaizumi cattle, Mishima cattle, Aso cattle, and others. However, these were not actual breeds, but only names of regional classifications.

In the case of Hyōgo Prefecture, the leading producer of Wagyu cattle (Kobe cattle and Tajima cattle) at that time, the number of stud bulls owned by breed as of 1914 was as follows.

Number of stud bulls owned in Hyōgo Prefecture by breed (1914)
	National	Prefectural	Publicly owned	Private	Total
Ayrshire Breed		30	5	17	52
Ayrshire Crossbreed				11	11
Brown Swiss Breed		5			5
Brown Swiss Crossbreed		4			4
Holstein Breed				18	18
Holstein Crossbreed				23	23
Jersey Crossbreed				1	1
Improved Japanese Breed	1	13	57	2	73
Japanese Breed			71	16	87
Total	1	52	133	88	274

Even after the Meiji era when hybrid cattle were encouraged, there were still a considerable number of pure Wagyu cattle remaining in the Taisho era (1912–1926). As a policy for the improvement of Wagyu, efforts were made to eliminate negative characteristics of hybrid cattle as much as possible. Specifically, the elimination of sudare (tiger stripes), nori-kuchi (grayish-white lips), unagi-sen (different fur color on the dorsal line), white spots, etc. On the other hand, efforts were made to improve the physique and weight of both pure and improved Wagyu cattle, and from around the 1920s, the term "improved Wagyu" came to refer to all Wagyu cattle, including not only improved Wagyu but also pure Wagyu.

Around 1919, the examination and registration of Wagyu began mainly in western Japan, and pedigrees and body types began to be registered. Nine breeds were registered: Tajima, Bisaku, Hiroshima, Bocho, Shimane, Inhaku, Bungo, Kumamoto, and Kagoshima. However, the examination and registration process was carried out by each prefecture, and the criteria for examination varied. Around 1925, the results of the improvements became visible: the negative characteristics of crossbreeding had almost disappeared from Wagyu cattle, their size and weight had increased, and improvements in hindquarters were clearly visible.

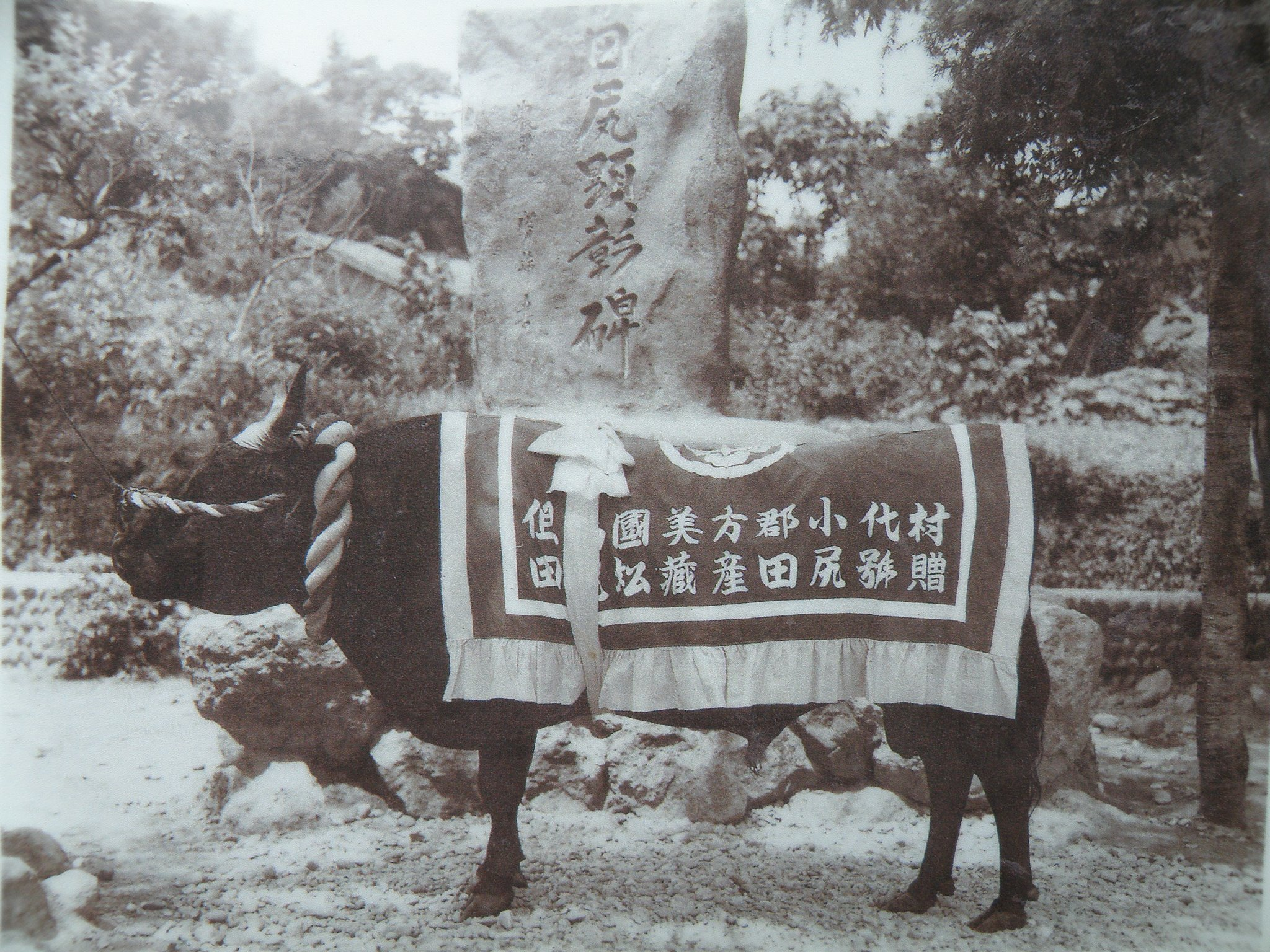
"Tajiri-go," a famous bull of the Japanese black

In 1937, when the former Japan Livestock Industry Association became the central organization for the registration of cattle throughout Japan, the breed names of "Japanese Black," "Japanese Polled," and "Japanese Brown" were created in place of the above nine breeds.

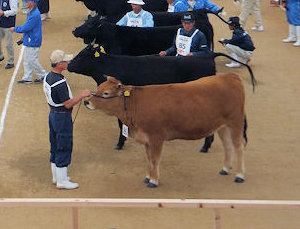
Japanese brown

In 1944, it was officially decided to abolish the conventional name "Improved Japanese Breed" and call the breeds Japanese Black, Japanese Brown, and Japanese Polled, as the characteristics of each breed had been clarified as a result of improvements. This officially recognized the three crossbreeds as fixed breeds. Then, in 1957, the Japanese Shorthorn was added. They are collectively known as Wagyu.

The Uruguay Round of the General Agreement on Tariffs and Trade (GATT) from 1986 to 1994, which set rules for liberalization of international trade, decided to liberalize imports of foreign beef to Japan. Beef imports have been liberalized since 1991. In 1993, beef imports jumped 34% over the previous year, and as a result, Japan's beef self-sufficiency rate dropped below 50%.

The liberalization of beef imports has brought about changes in Japan's domestic Wagyu beef production system. In order to compete with cheaper foreign beef, Japanese livestock farmers have become more focused on raising the Japanese Black breed, which has a unique marbling characteristic. As a result, the number of the other three Wagyu breeds has decreased.

Following the outbreak of Bovine Spongiform Encephalopathy (BSE) in Japan, the Law for Special Measures Concerning the Management and Relay of Information for Individual Identification of Cattle (Beef Traceability Law) was enacted in 2003. This law stipulates the attachment of ear tags to cattle, the notification, recording, and storage of historical information from birth to beef, and the publication of recorded information on the Internet. In other words, it is possible to trace the history of all Japanese beef sold in Japan.

== Breeds and brands ==
=== Breeds ===
Wagyu grazing video

==== Wagyu ====
Most of today's Wagyu are improved Wagyu (改良和牛, kairyō wagyū) that have been fixed as breeds through crossbreeding with foreign breeds. There are four breeds of improved Wagyu as follows:

- The Japanese Black (黒毛和種, kuroge washu), which constitutes over 97% of beef cattle in Japan; regional strains within the breed include the Tottori, Tajima, Shimane and Okayama.
- The Japanese Brown or Japanese Red (褐毛和種, akage washu or akaushi), the other main breed, representing about 5% of all beef cattle; reared in southern Japan, in Kōchi Prefecture on Shikoku island, and in Kumamoto Prefecture on Kyushu island.
- The Japanese Polled (無角和種, mukaku washu), found principally in Yamaguchi Prefecture
- The Japanese Shorthorn (日本短角和種, nihon tankaku washu), reared in northern Japan, mainly in Iwate Prefecture; it constitutes less than one percent of all wagyu cattle.

==== Native Wagyu ====
Native Wagyu (在来和牛, zairai wagyū) are cattle from ancient Japan that have not been crossbred with foreign breeds. It is also called "Japanese breed," "pure Japanese breed," "pure Wagyu," etc. There are two breeds of native Wagyu as follows:

- Mishima cattle
- Kuchinoshima cattle

=== Brands ===
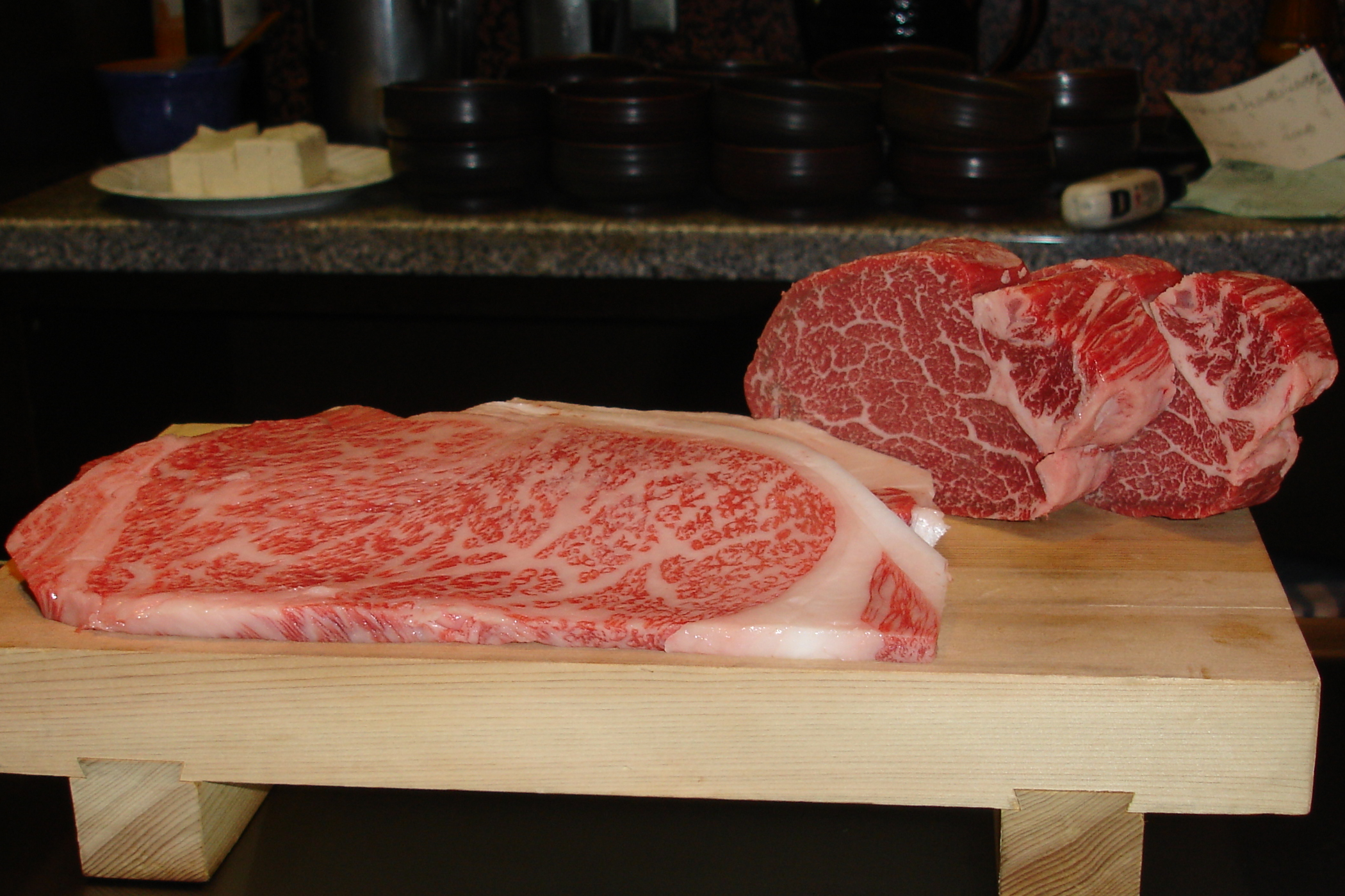
Kobe beef

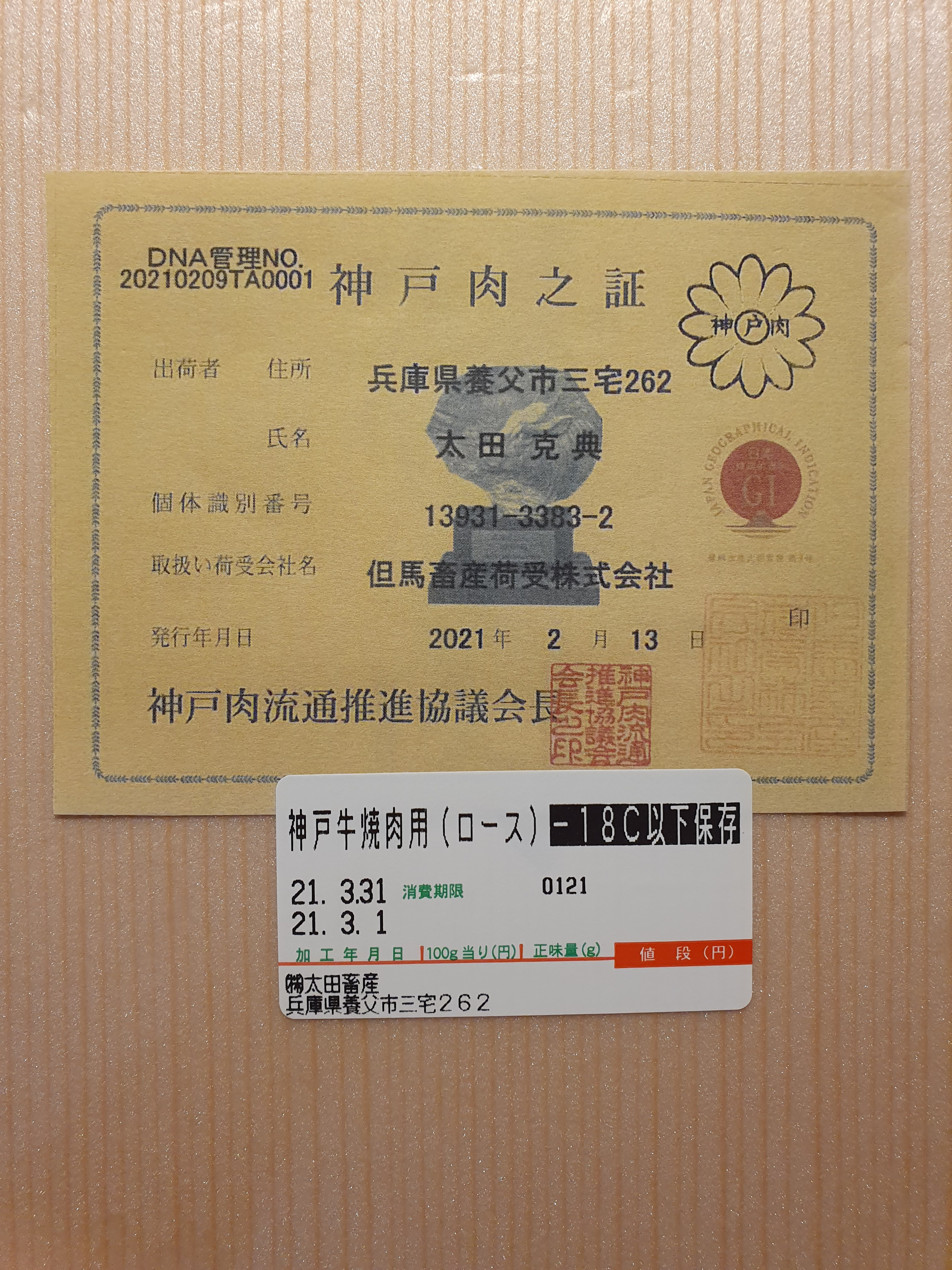
Kobe beef certificate

Today, each region in Japan has its own brand of Wagyu beef, numbering more than 320. The first Wagyu beef to gain a reputation was Kobe beef, already famous since the 1860s and known to foreign countries through foreign residents. Ōmi beef also had a reputation since the Meiji era (1868–1912) for its delicious taste. In the Taisho era (1912–1926), Matsusaka beef also became well known. These were originally Tajima cattle, and calves were purchased from the Tajima region, fattened in each region, and then sold. In the Tokyo area, Yonezawa beef has also been known since the Meiji era.

Since the 1980s, Wagyu beef branding has been promoted in various regions of Japan. However, the Japanese Trademark Law at the time did not allow for the establishment of regional collective trademarks, which posed a problem in terms of legal protection. Before the Beef Traceability Law (2003) was enacted, there were also issues regarding the verification of the origin, breeding location, and distribution of Wagyu beef.

In 2006, the Japanese Trademark Law was amended to recognize regional collective trademarks, allowing Wagyu beef to be registered as a "regional brand." In 2014, the Geographical Indications Law was passed, and the operation of Geographical Indications (GI) protection began in 2015. Currently, the GI-registered brands of Wagyu beef are as follows.

- Tajima Beef: Tajima beef is beef from the Tajima region of Hyōgo Prefecture, and has a history of about 1,200 years.
- Kobe Beef: Kobe Beef is a brand given to the highest quality beef from Hyōgo Prefecture's Tajima cattle and has a history of about 170 years.
- Special Matsusaka Beef: Special Matsuzaka Beef (Tokusan Matsusaka Ushi) is a brand given to the highest quality virgin female beef from the Matsuzaka region of Mie Prefecture. The Matsusaka beef brand has a history of about 100 years.
- Yonezawa Beef: Yonezawa Beef (Yonezawa Gyu) is beef from virgin Japanese black female cattle in the Okitama region of Yamagata Prefecture and has a history of about 150 years.
- Maesawa Beef: Maesawa Beef is a brand given to the highest quality beef from the Maesawa area of Iwate Prefecture, and has a history of about 70 years.
- Miyazaki Beef: Miyazaki Beef is a brand of wagyu beef from Miyazaki Prefecture, and has often won the Wagyu Olympics in recent years.
- Ōmi Beef: Ōmi Beef is a wagyu beef brand from Shiga Prefecture with a history of about 400 years.
- Kagoshima Black Beef: Kagoshima Black Beef (Kagoshima Kuroushi) is a wagyu beef brand from Kagoshima Prefecture that won the recent Wagyu Olympics.
- Kumamoto Red Beef: Kumamoto Red Beef (Kuamoto Akaushi) is a wagyu beef from Kumamoto Prefecture, characterized by its lean meat.
- Hiba Beef: Hiba Beef is a brand of Japanese black cattle from Shobara City, Hiroshima Prefecture, with a history dating back to the Edo period.
- Hida Beef: Hida Beef is a Japanese beef from Gifu Prefecture and has a history of about 100 years.
- Olive-Fed Wagyu Beef: Olive-Fed Wagyu Beef is a brand of Japanese black cattle that is fed olives. It is one of the rarest beef in the world.

== Characteristics of Wagyu beef ==
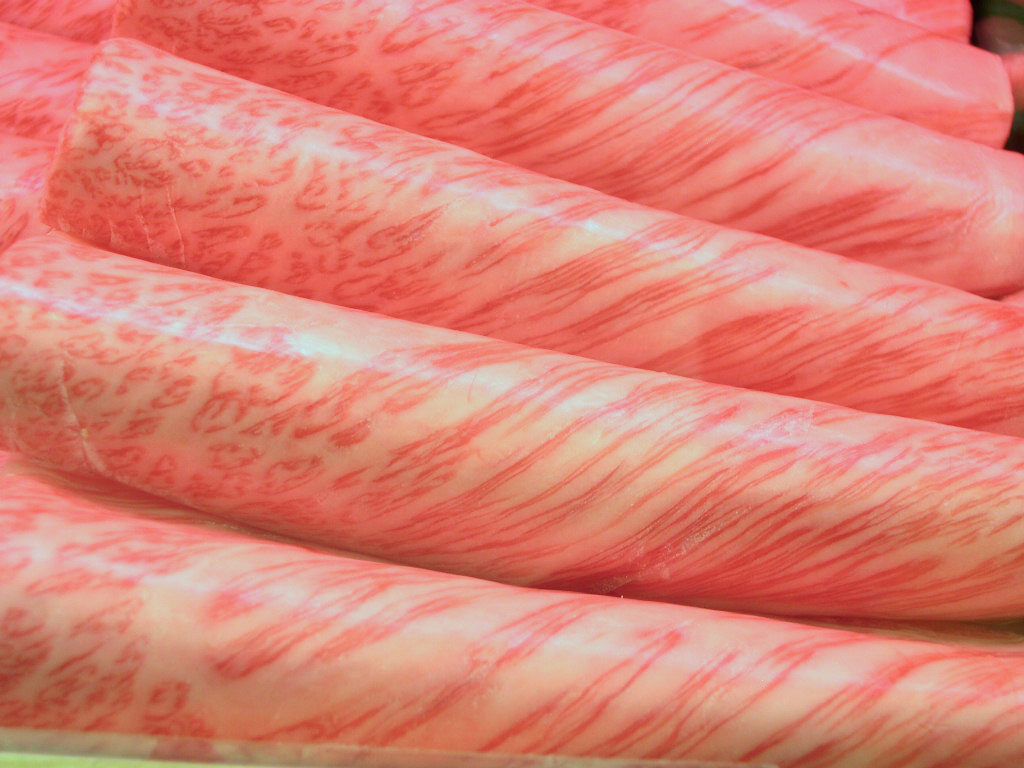
Wagyu beef marbling

A defining characteristic of Wagyu beef is its abundant, finely distributed intramuscular fat, referred to in Japanese as sashi. Among the four Wagyu breeds, this high degree of marbling is especially characteristic of Japanese Black cattle, whose beef has been reported to contain more than 30% intramuscular fat. The degree of marbling is influenced by genetic, physiological, and feeding factors, although the mechanisms that enable Japanese Black cattle to produce such highly marbled beef are not yet fully understood.

Pronounced marbling is also found in Mishima cattle. Mishima and Kuchinoshima cattle—the latter producing lean meat—are the two native Japanese cattle populations considered to have remained free from European genetic influence. The occurrence of pronounced marbling in Mishima cattle therefore suggests that at least some native Japanese cattle already possessed a genetic capacity for marbling before European crossbreeding was used to develop the modern Wagyu breeds. Among Japanese Black cattle, the Tajima strain is less prone to depositing subcutaneous and intermuscular fat but readily develops intramuscular marbling.

The fat in Japanese Black beef contains a high proportion of monounsaturated fatty acids, particularly oleic acid. This composition gives the fat a relatively low melting point and soft consistency, contributing to the characteristic melt-in-the-mouth texture and rich juiciness of highly marbled Wagyu beef.

Beef from Japanese Black cattle also develops a distinctive rich, sweet aroma during cooking, commonly called "Wagyu beef aroma". This aroma involves a complex mixture of odor-active compounds, with several γ-lactones—notably γ-hexalactone, γ-decalactone, and γ-undecalactone—showing a strong correlation with its perceived intensity. Analyses comparing Wagyu with beef imported into Japan have found higher total lactone content in Wagyu, with lactone content increasing during heating, particularly roasting.

== Wagyu beef grades ==
Beef grades indicate the meat quality, and in Japan they are determined based on the "Beef Carcass Trade Standards" approved by the Ministry of Agriculture, Forestry and Fisheries. Two factors are used to determine the rating: the yield grade and the meat quality grade.

The yield grade has three levels: A, B, and C, with A being the highest. The meat quality grade has five levels: 5, 4, 3, 2, and 1, with 5 being the highest.

Beef is graded in 15 combinations: A1 to A5, B1 to B5, and C1 to C5, with A5 representing the highest quality for both yield and meat quality.

The yield grade refers to the percentage of edible meat in the carcass. The meat quality grade is determined by four criteria: marbling, meat color, firmness and texture, and fat luster and quality.

Beef Grades
Yield Grade	Meat Quality Grade				
Yield Grade	5	4	3	2	1
A	A5	A4	A3	A2	A1
B	B5	B4	B3	B2	B1
C	C5	C4	C3	C2	C1

== International Wagyu ==
International Wagyu is regulated and promoted through the World Wagyu Council. National Wagyu Day, also referred to as World Wagyu Day, is on June 21 to promote Wagyu by the World Wagyu Council. This day was founded in 2022 by Steve Haddadin and was adopted by the World Wagyu Council and British Wagyu Breeders Association as World Wagyu Day.

=== Australia ===
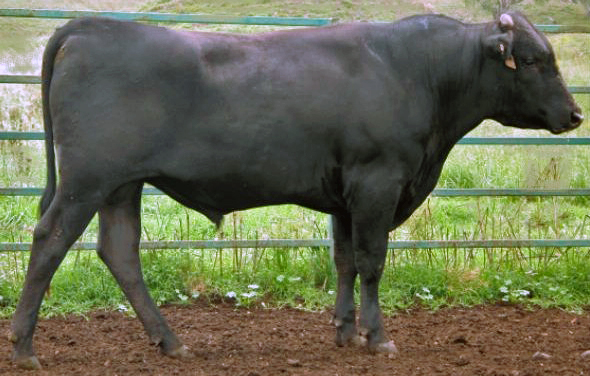
A Wagyu bull in Australia

The Australian Wagyu Association is the largest breed association outside Japan. Both fullblood and Wagyu-cross cattle are farmed in Australia for domestic and overseas markets, including China, Denmark, France, Germany, Hong Kong, Indonesia, Singapore, Taiwan, the United Kingdom and the United States. Australian Wagyu cattle are grain fed for the last 300–500 days of production. Wagyu bred in Western Australia's Margaret River region often have red wine added to their feed as well.

=== United States ===
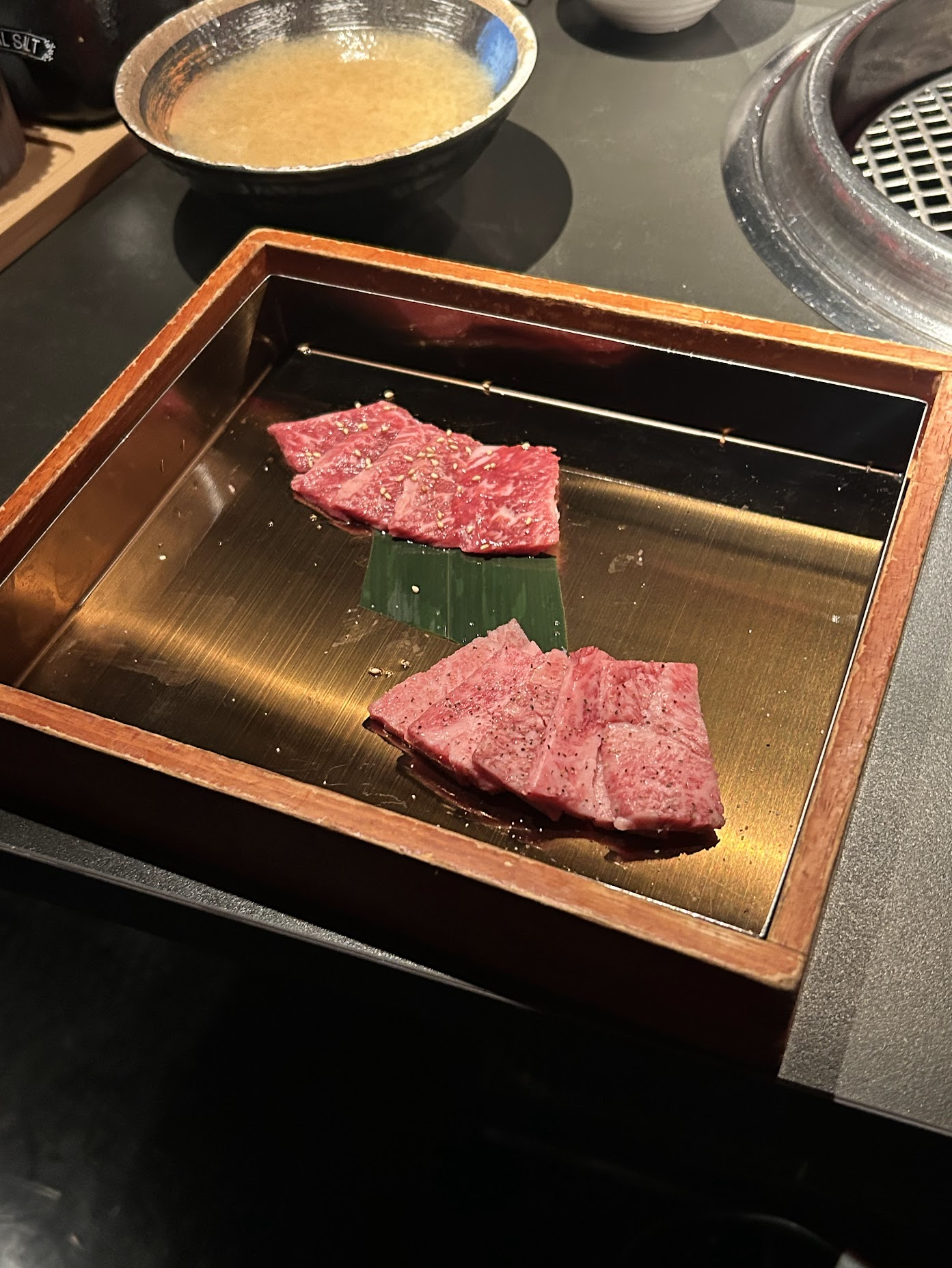
Thinly sliced wagyu beef served raw on a tray at a yakiniku restaurant in Atlanta, Georgia, United States in 2025. The meat shows the characteristic intramuscular marbling typical of high grade wagyu beef.

Both full-blood Wagyu and Wagyu-cross cattle are bred in the United States. The U.S. Department of Agriculture allows any animal with at least 46.875% of Wagyu genetic makeup to be called Wagyu; alternatively it may be marketed with terms such as "American-Style Kobe Beef" or "Wangus". Wagyu were first competitively exhibited at the National Western Stock Show in 2012. Other U.S. Wagyu breeders have full-blooded animals directly descended from original Japanese bloodlines, that are registered through the American Wagyu Association.

=== Canada ===
Wagyu cattle farming in Canada appeared after 1991 when the Canadian Wagyu Association was formed. Wagyu style cattle and farms in Canada are located in Alberta, Saskatchewan, Ontario, Quebec, British Columbia, Prince Edward Island, and Newfoundland and Labrador. Canadian Wagyu beef products are exported to the United States (including Hawaii), Australia, New Zealand, Korea, Taiwan, Singapore, Hong Kong and Europe.

=== United Kingdom ===
In 2008, a herd of Wagyu cattle was imported to North Yorkshire, first becoming available for consumption in 2011. Since 2011, there have been Wagyu herds in Scotland. There are British & Irish Wagyu Fullbloods registered through the British Wagyu Breeders Association.

=== Brazil ===
Brazilian Wagyu is regulated and promoted by the Brazilian Wagyu Association, a member of the World Wagyu Council.

=== Germany ===
German Wagyu is regulated and promoted by the German Wagyu Association, a member of the World Wagyu Council.

=== South Africa ===
South African Wagyu is regulated and promoted by the Wagyu Society of South Africa, a member of the World Wagyu Council.

=== Namibia ===
Namibian Wagyu is regulated and promoted by the Namibian Wagyu Society, a member of the World Wagyu Council.

=== New Zealand ===
New Zealand Wagyu is regulated and promoted by the New Zealand Wagyu Breeders, a member of the World Wagyu Council.
