= Japanese Shorthorn =

Japanese breed of cattle

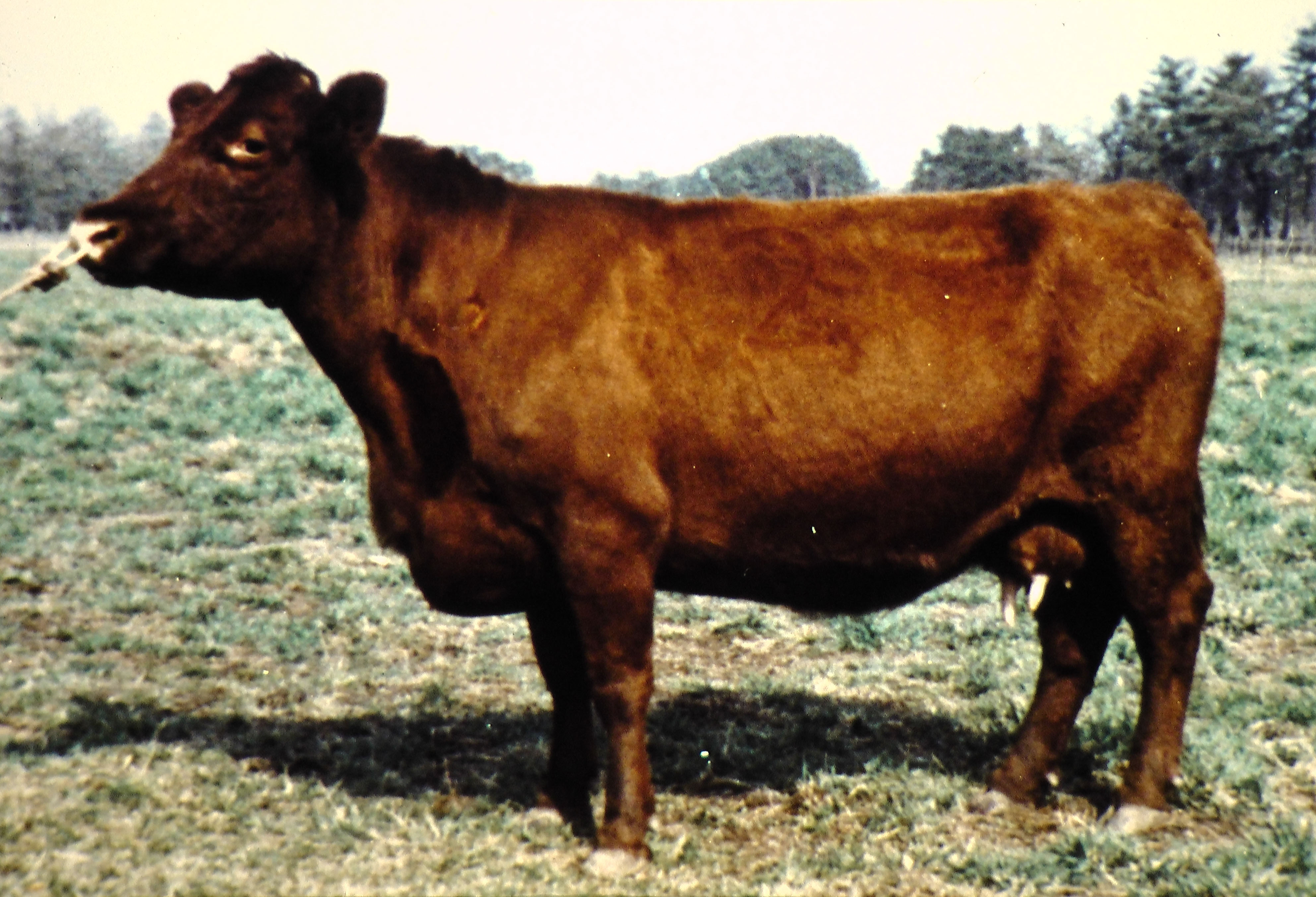
- Cow

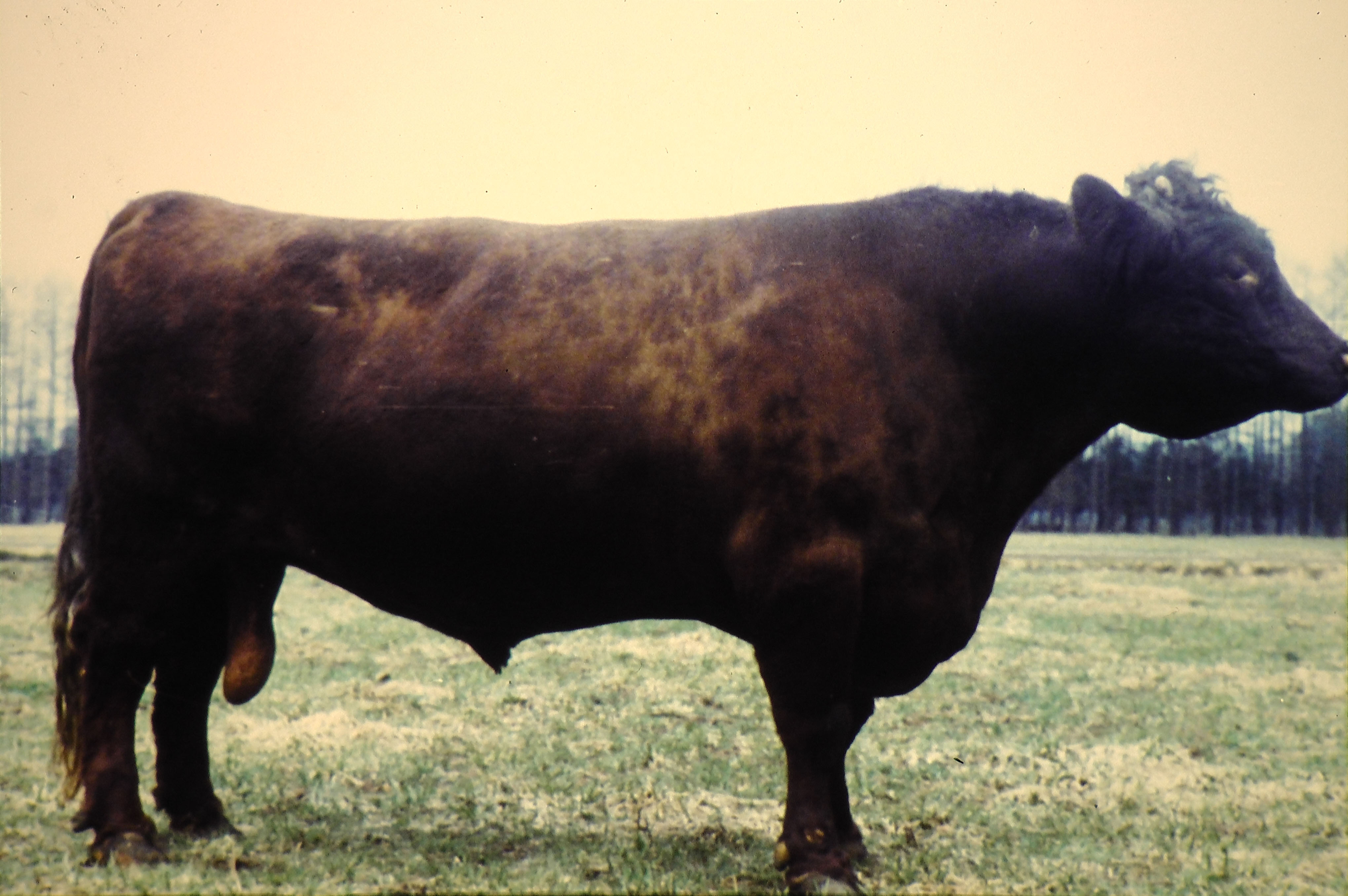
- Bull
- Conservation status: FAO (2007): not at risk
- Other names: Japanese: 日本短角種; Nihon Tankaku Washu
- Country of origin: Japan
- Distribution: northern Honshu; Hokkaido
- Use: meat

Traits
- Coat: red, roan, or red-pied
- Horn status: horned in both sexes

The Japanese Shorthorn (Japanese: 日本短角種, Nihon Tankaku Washu) is a Japanese breed of small beef cattle. It is one of six native Japanese cattle breeds, and one of the four Japanese breeds known as wagyū, the others being the Japanese Black, the Japanese Brown and the Japanese Polled.

All wagyū cattle derive from cross-breeding in the early twentieth century of native Japanese cattle with imported stock, mostly from Europe. In the case of the Japanese Shorthorn, the principal foreign influence was from the Shorthorn, with some contribution from the Ayrshire and Devon breeds.

== History ==
Cattle were brought to Japan from China at the same time as the cultivation of rice, in about the second century AD, in the Yayoi period. Until about the time of the Meiji Restoration in 1868, they were used only as draught animals, in agriculture, forestry, mining and for transport, and as a source of fertiliser. Milk consumption was unknown, and – for cultural and religious reasons – meat was not eaten. Cattle were highly prized and valuable, too expensive for a poor farmer to buy.

Japan was effectively isolated from the rest of the world from 1635 until 1854; there was no possibility of intromission of foreign genes to the cattle population during this time. Between 1868, the year of the Meiji Restoration, and 1887, some 2600 foreign cattle were imported. At first there was little interest in cross-breeding these with native stock, but from about 1900 it became widespread. It ceased abruptly in 1910, when it was realised that, while the cross-breeds might be larger and have better dairy qualities, their working capacity and meat quality was lower. From 1919, the various heterogeneous regional populations that resulted from this brief period of cross-breeding were registered and selected as "Improved Japanese Cattle". Four separate strains were characterised, based mainly on which type of foreign cattle had most influenced the hybrids, and were recognised as breeds in 1944. These were the four wagyū breeds, the Japanese Shorthorn, the Japanese Black, the Japanese Brown and the Japanese Polled.

The Japanese Shorthorn developed in the northernmost part of Honshu, in the prefectures of Akita, Aomori and Iwate. In Aomori and Iwate, the only foreign influence was from British Shorthorn cattle, while in Akita Prefecture there was also some admixture of Ayrshire and Devon, also British breeds. The Japanese Shorthorn is distributed in northern Honshu, and also in Hokkaido.

It was listed by the Food and Agriculture Organization of the United Nations as "not at risk" in 2007. In 2008 the total population was reported to be about 4500. The Japanese Shorthorn constitutes about 1.2% of the beef cattle herd of Japan.

== Characteristics ==
The coat of the Japanese Shorthorn may be red, roan, or red-pied; both sexes are horned.

== Use ==
The Japanese Shorthorn is raised only for beef. The meat has less marbling than that of the Japanese Black, and so commands a lower market price.
