= Japanese Brown =

Japanese breed of cattle

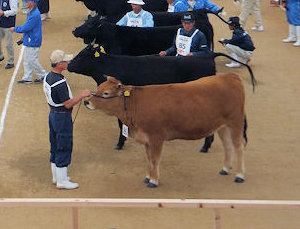
- Japanese Brown (foreground) at a wagyū show in Sasebo, Nagasaki
- Conservation status: FAO (2007): not at risk
- Other names: Japanese: 褐毛和種; Akage Washu; Akaushi
- Country of origin: Japan
- Distribution: Kōchi Prefecture, Shikoku; Kumamoto Prefecture, Kyushu
- Use: meat

Traits
- Coat: brown
- Horn status: horned in both sexes

The Japanese Brown (Japanese: 褐毛和種, Akage Washu or 赤牛, Aka Ushi) is a Japanese breed of small beef cattle. It is one of six native Japanese cattle breeds, and one of the four Japanese breeds known as wagyū, the others being the Japanese Black, the Japanese Polled and the Japanese Shorthorn.

All wagyū cattle derive from cross-breeding in the early twentieth century of native Japanese cattle with imported stock, mostly from Europe. In the case of the Japanese Brown, the principal foreign influence was from the Korean Hanwoo and Swiss Simmental breeds.

== Etymology ==
The Kanji characters 赤牛 literally mean "red cow".

== History ==
Cattle were brought to Japan from China at the same time as the cultivation of rice, in about the second century AD, in the Yayoi period. Until about the time of the Meiji Restoration in 1868, they were used only as draught animals, in agriculture, forestry, mining and for transport, and as a source of fertiliser. Milk consumption was unknown, and – for cultural and religious reasons – meat was not eaten. Cattle were highly prized and valuable, too expensive for a poor farmer to buy.

Japan was effectively isolated from the rest of the world from 1635 until 1854; there was no possibility of intromission of foreign genes to the cattle population during this time. Between 1868, the year of the Meiji Restoration, and 1887, some 2600 foreign cattle were imported. At first there was little interest in cross-breeding these with native stock, but from about 1900 it became widespread. It ceased abruptly in 1910, when it was realised that, while the cross-breeds might be larger and have better dairy qualities, their working capacity and meat quality was lower. From 1919, the various heterogeneous regional populations that resulted from this brief period of cross-breeding were registered and selected as "Improved Japanese Cattle". Four separate strains were characterised, based mainly on which type of foreign cattle had most influenced the hybrids, and were recognised as breeds in 1944. These were the four wagyū breeds, the Japanese Brown, the Japanese Black, the Japanese Polled and the Japanese Shorthorn.

The Japanese Brown developed in southern Japan, in Kōchi Prefecture on Shikoku island, and in Kumamoto Prefecture on Kyushu island. The principal foreign influences on the breed were from the British Devon, Korean Hanwoo and Swiss Simmental cattle breeds.

In 1960 the total breed population was reported to be over 525000. In 1978 it was reported as 72000, and in 2008 it was 18672. The Japanese Brown constitutes about 4.8% of the national beef herd. Its conservation status was listed by the Food and Agriculture Organization of the United Nations in 2007 as "not at risk".

A small number were exported to the United States in 1994.

== Characteristics ==
Japanese Brown cattle in Kōchi Prefecture are reddish-brown, while those in Kumamoto Prefecture are light brown; both sexes are horned.
