= Japanese Polled =

Japanese breed of cattle

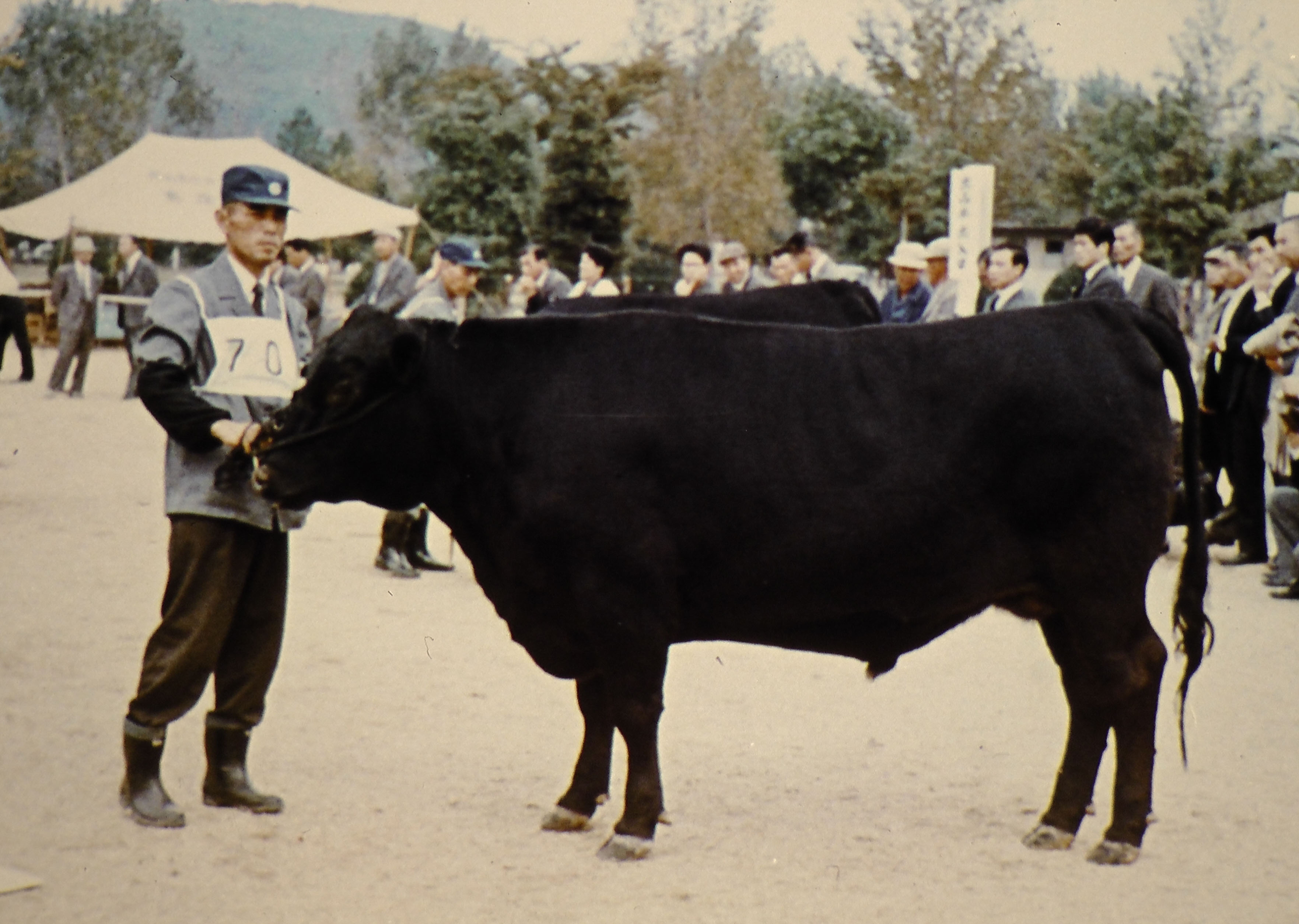
- Bull

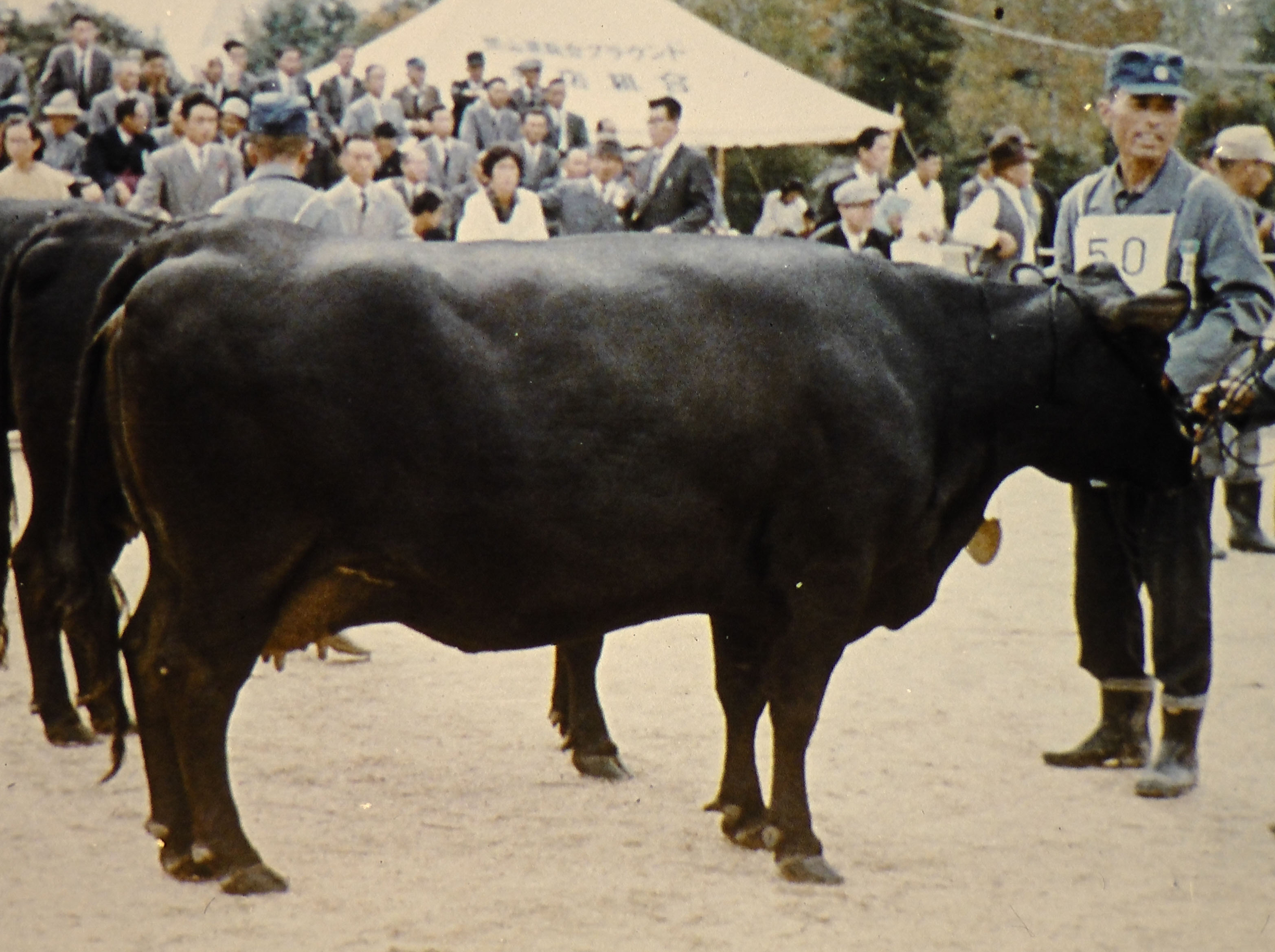
- Cow
- Conservation status: FAO (2007): critical
- Other names: Japanese: 無角和種; Mukaku Washu; Japanese Poll
- Country of origin: Japan
- Distribution: Yamaguchi Prefecture
- Use: beef

Traits
- Coat: black
- Horn status: polled (hornless) in both sexes
- Cattle; Bos (primigenius) taurus

The Japanese Polled (Japanese: 無角和種, Mukaku Washu) is an endangered Japanese breed of small beef cattle. It is one of six native Japanese cattle breeds, and one of the four Japanese breeds known as wagyū, the others being the Japanese Black, the Japanese Brown and the Japanese Shorthorn.

All wagyū cattle derive from cross-breeding in the early twentieth century of native Japanese cattle with imported stock, mostly from Europe. In the case of the Japanese Polled, the principal foreign influence was from the Scottish Aberdeen Angus breed.

== History ==
Cattle were brought to Japan from China at the same time as the cultivation of rice, in about the second century AD, in the Yayoi period. Until about the time of the Meiji Restoration in 1868, they were used only as draught animals, in agriculture, forestry, mining and for transport, and as a source of fertiliser. Milk consumption was unknown, and – for cultural and religious reasons – meat was not eaten. Cattle were highly prized and valuable, too expensive for a poor farmer to buy.

Japan was effectively isolated from the rest of the world from 1635 until 1854; there was no possibility of intromission of foreign genes to the cattle population during this time. Between 1868, the year of the Meiji Restoration, and 1887, some 2600 foreign cattle were imported. At first there was little interest in cross-breeding these with native stock, but from about 1900 it became widespread. It ceased abruptly in 1910, when it was realised that, while the cross-breeds might be larger and have better dairy qualities, their working capacity and meat quality was lower. From 1919, the various heterogeneous regional populations that resulted from this brief period of cross-breeding were registered and selected as "Improved Japanese Cattle". Four separate strains were characterised, based mainly on which type of foreign cattle had most influenced the hybrids, and were recognised as breeds in 1944. These were the four wagyū breeds, the Japanese Polled, the Japanese Black, the Japanese Brown and the Japanese Shorthorn.

The Japanese Polled developed in south-western Honshu, in the prefecture of Yamaguchi. The principal foreign influence was from Scottish the Aberdeen Angus.

The conservation status of the Japanese Polled was listed by the Food and Agriculture Organization of the United Nations as "critical" in 2007. In 1978 the total population was reported to be 2242; in 2008 it was 132. Although not at risk of immediate extinction, the breed is in need of emergency measures for its protection. The Japanese Polled Public Corporation has been set up by the administration of Yamaguchi Prefecture to protect and preserve the breed and its genetic resources.

== Characteristics ==
The Japanese Polled is black; both sexes are naturally polled, without horns.
