= North Devon cattle =

Breed of cattle

North Devon
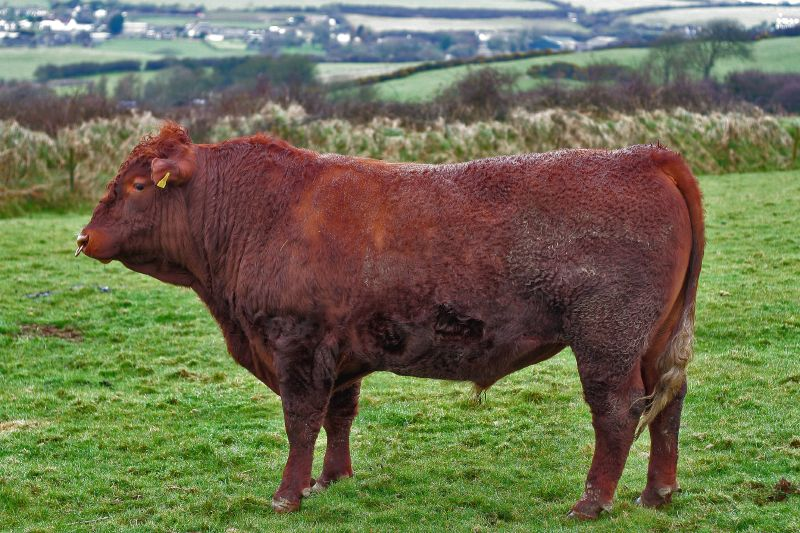
- A bull
- Conservation status: FAO (2007): not at risk; DAD-IS (2022): not at risk
- Other names: Beef Devon; Devon; Devon Ruby; Devon Red Ruby; Red Devon; Red Ruby
- Country of origin: United Kingdom
- Distribution: Australia; North America; South America; United Kingdom
- Use: formerly triple-purpose (meat/milk/draught); now principally beef

Traits
- Weight: Male: average 980 kg; Female: average 630 kg
- Height: Male: average 136 cm; Female: average 130 cm
- Coat: deep rich red
- Cattle; Bos (primigenius) taurus

The Devon is a traditional British breed of beef cattle. It originated in, and is named for, the county of Devon in the West Country of England. It is a deep rich red in colour, and so may be known as the Devon Ruby, Ruby red or Red Ruby; it may also be called the North Devon to distinguish it from the South Devon.

== History ==
The Devon is a traditional breed of the county of Devon in the West Country of England.

A herdbook was started by John Tanner Davy in 1850. A breed society, the Devon Cattle Breeders' Society, was formed in 1884, and took over management of the herd-book.

By the early twentieth century the Devon was widespread. A census in 1908 found a population of close to 500,000, outnumbered only by the Shorthorn – of which there were about ten times that number.

=== In the United States ===
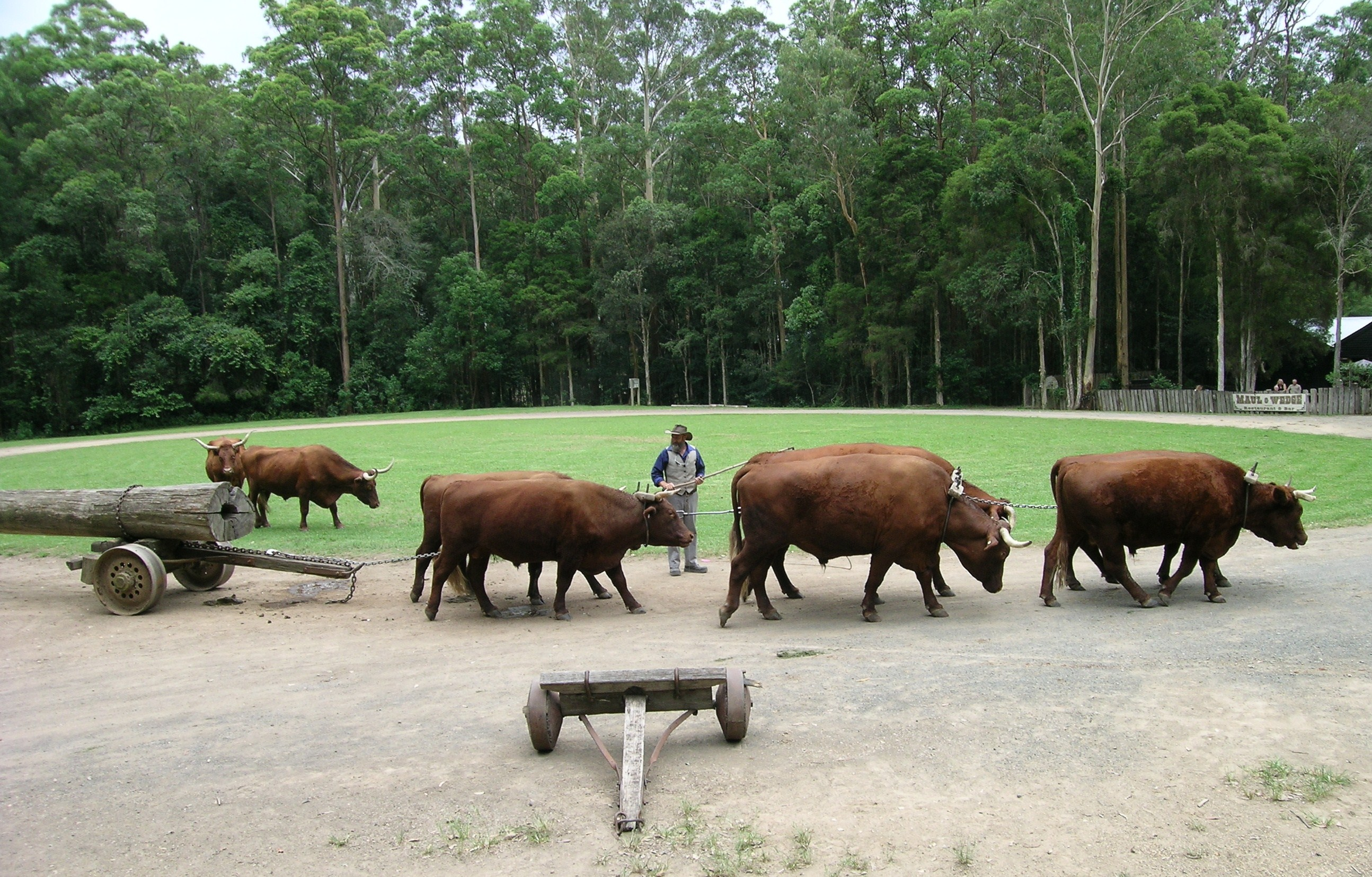
Devon bullock team, Timbertown, Wauchope, New South Wales

=== In Australia ===
Devons were popular for use in bullock teams for hauling cedar and other logs from the forests, which was pit sawn and then transported by bullock drawn wagons and timber junkers to towns and seaports for cabinet making or export. These cattle were among the earliest breeds in Australia and Devons were noted for their docility, early maturing, hardiness and strength which were important attributes to have in a team.
