= Ebisugahana Shipyard =

UNESCO World Heritage Site
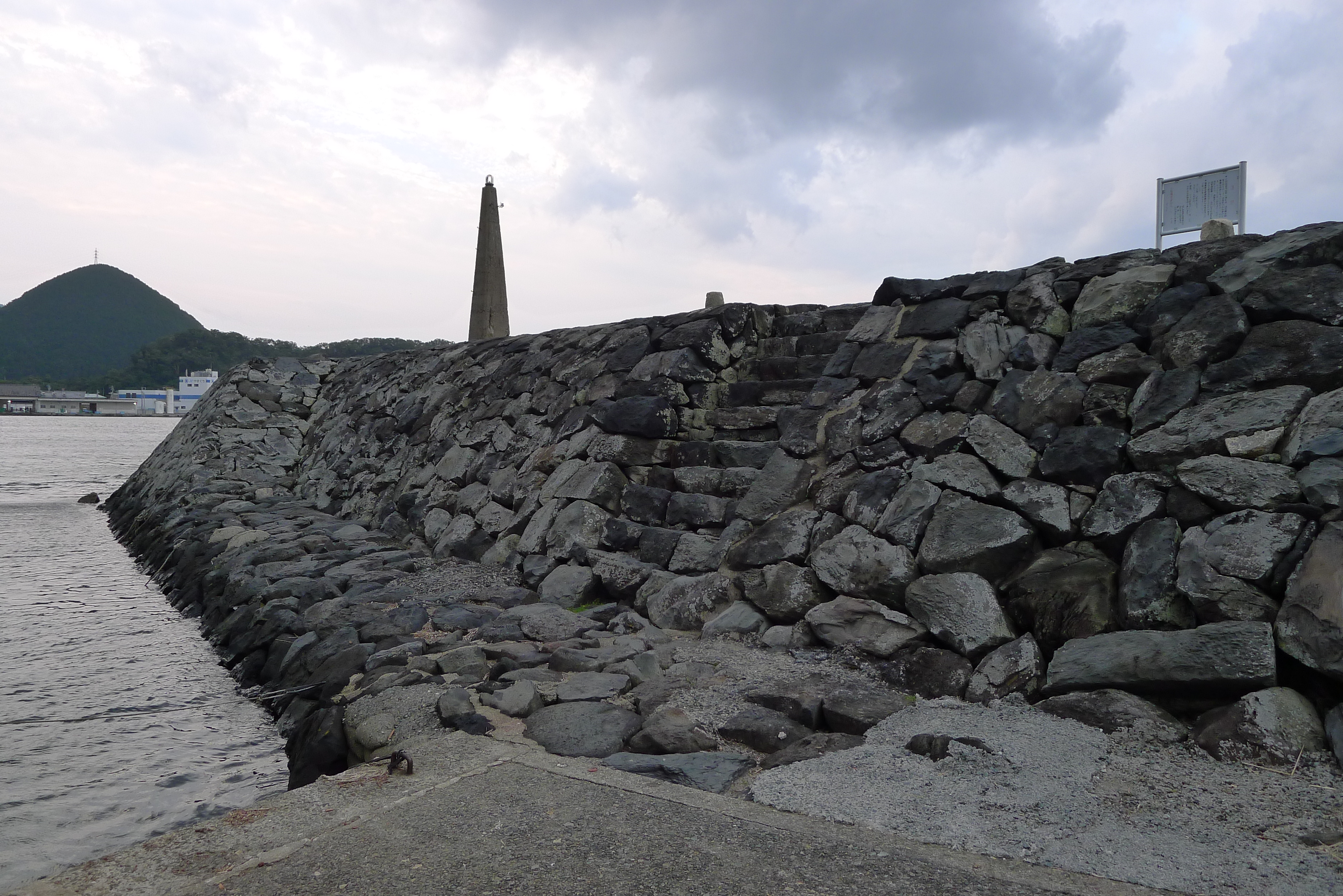
- Breakwater at Ebisugahana Shipyard

- Location within Yamaguchi Prefecture Location within Japan
- Location: Hagi, Yamaguchi, Japan
- Part of: Sites of Japan's Meiji Industrial Revolution: Iron and Steel, Shipbuilding and Coal Mining
- Criteria: Cultural:
- Reference: 1484
- Inscription: 2015 (39th Session)
- Coordinates: 34°25′48.1″N 131°24′43.6″E
- National Historic Site of Japan

The Ebisugahana Shipyard (恵美須ヶ鼻造船所跡, Ebisugahana sōzenjo ato) was a shipyard opened in 1865 in Bakumatsu period Japan, located in the Chinto neighborhood of the city of Hagi, Yamaguchi Prefecture in the San'yō region of Japan. The site was designated a National Historic Site of Japan in 2013. In 2007, it was certified as a modern industrial heritage by the Ministry of Economy, Trade and Industry. Furthermore, in 2015, it was listed as part of the UNESCO World Heritage Site Sites of Japan's Meiji Industrial Revolution: Iron and Steel, Shipbuilding and Coal Mining.

== History ==
During the Bakumatsu period, the growing number of incursions of foreign warships (kurofune) attempting to end Japan's self-imposed national isolation policy was of increasing concern to the Tokugawa shogunate. The Japanese were well aware of European imperialism and the European conquest of many parts of Asia. A few months following the Perry Expedition of 1853, the shogunate's ban on the construction of large ocean-capable ships was rescinded, and various feudal domains were instructed to construct modern warships. Chōshū Domain, who was charge of guarding the entry to Edo Bay at Uraga initially took a passive stance. This was partly due to its centuries-old antagonism towards the Tokugawa regime, and was also due to financial reasons, as the domain was attempting to rapidly rearm its military with western weapons. However, Katsura Kogorō submitted a treatise on the construction of warships to the clan leadership, and in the following year, Mōri Takachika, the daimyō of Chōshū authorized the construction of the Ebisugahana shipyards. A master carpenter, Ōzaki Koemon, was sent to Heda in Izu Province, where a two-masted schooner was under construction with Russian assistance to replace the frigate Diana which had been lost in the Ansei-Tōkai earthquake of 23 December 1854. Ōzaki invited the chief carpenter Takasaki Denzō to relocate to Chōshū in 1855 and in December of the same year, Chōshū Domain's first warship, the 25-meter Heitatsu Maru, was launched. In June of the following year, the ship successfully made a trial run to the island of Mishima, located some 40 kilometers off the coast.

In 1860, another carpenter, Fujii Katsunoshin, who had studied under the Dutch at the Nagasaki Naval Training Center, returned to Chōshū and supervised the construction of the domain's second vessel, the 43-meter, three-masted Kōshin Maru, equipped with eight cannon. In 1863, Kōshin Maru was sunk by an American warship during the Battle of Shimonoseki Straits, but was later salvaged and continued to be used by Chōshū Domain until about 1868. The nails, fittings and anchors for these vessels was supplied from the Ohitayama Tatara Iron Works using the traditional tatara methods.

However, these were the only ships constructed by Chōshū Domain as the clan began to purchase foreign-made steamships instead. The site of the shipyard has been under archaeological excavation since 2009. The dig has revealed traces of a rope-spinning shop, a blacksmith's foundry, a sawmill, a steam works, a design shop, and a drydock. In 2015, Ebisugahana Shipyard was recognized as part of the UNESCO World Heritage Site: Sites of Japan's Meiji Industrial Revolution: Iron and Steel, Shipbuilding and Coal Mining. Most of the shipyard site is now occupied by private homes. A stone breakwater still exists, but the remainder of the ruins were backfilled after excavation. The site is located about 15 minutes by car from JR West Higashi-Hagi Station.

== Notes ==
- List of World Heritage Sites in Japan
- List of Historic Sites of Japan (Yamaguchi)
