= Mishima Island, Yamaguchi =

Island in Yamaguchi, Japan

Mishima
Native name: Japanese: 見島
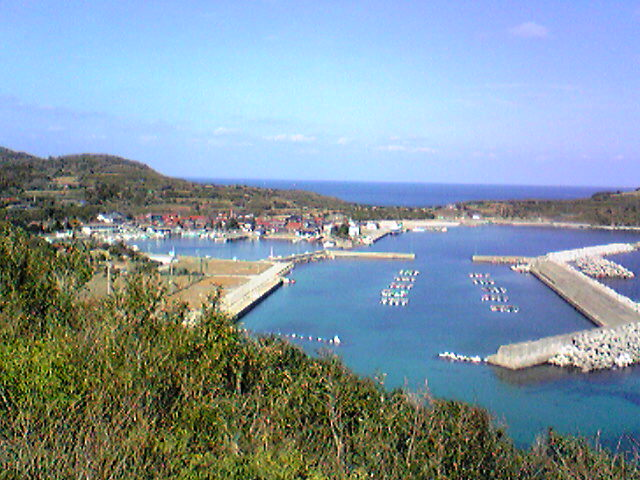
- Utsu harbour

- Mishima Island is at the top left of the map.

Geography
- Location: Sea of Japan
- Coordinates: 34.77°N 131.14°E
- Archipelago: Hagi
- Area: 7.73 km^{2} (2.98 sq mi)

Administration
- Japan
- Yamaguchi Prefecture

Demographics
- Population: 829
- Ethnic groups: Japanese

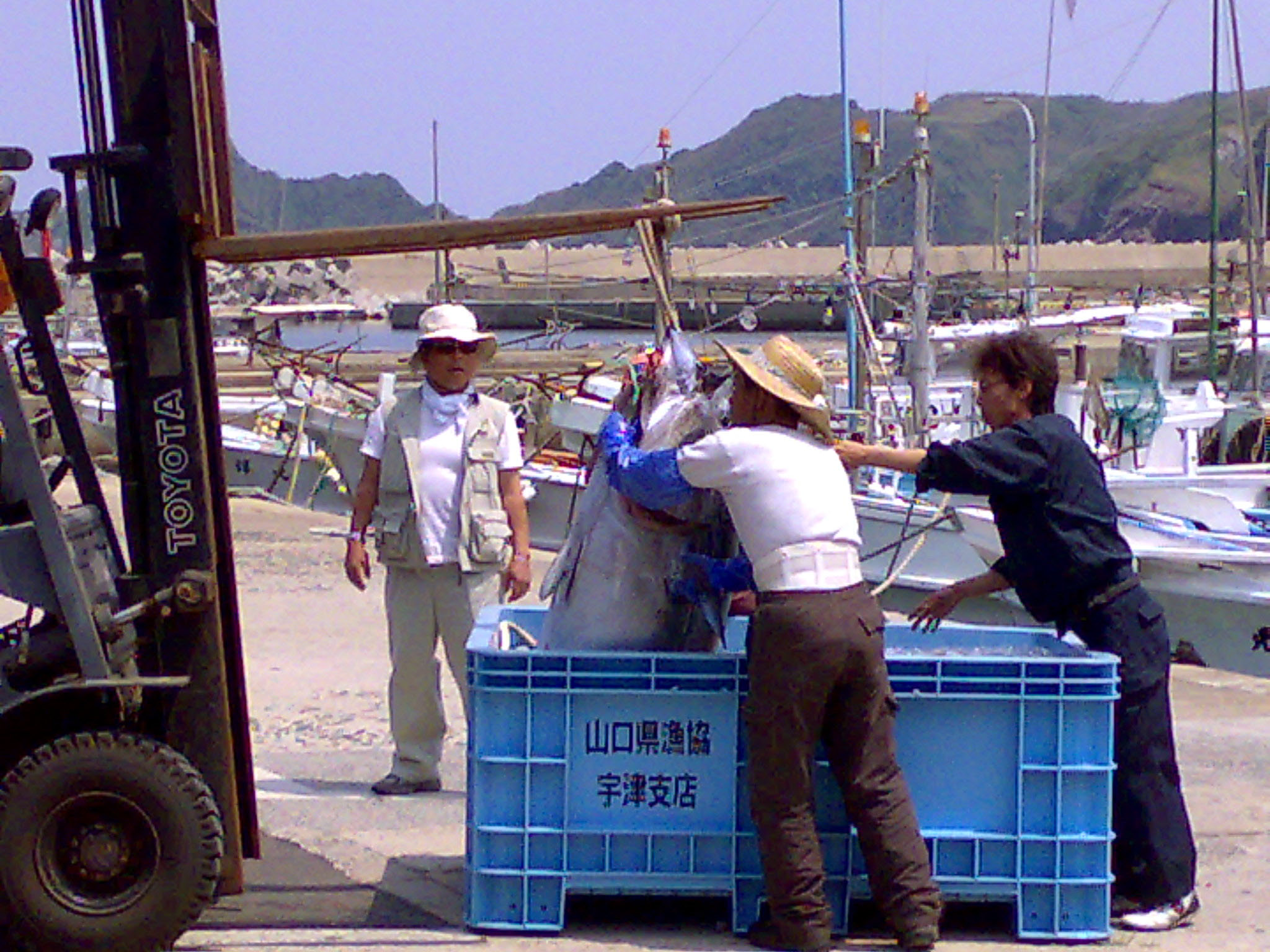
Landing bluefin tuna

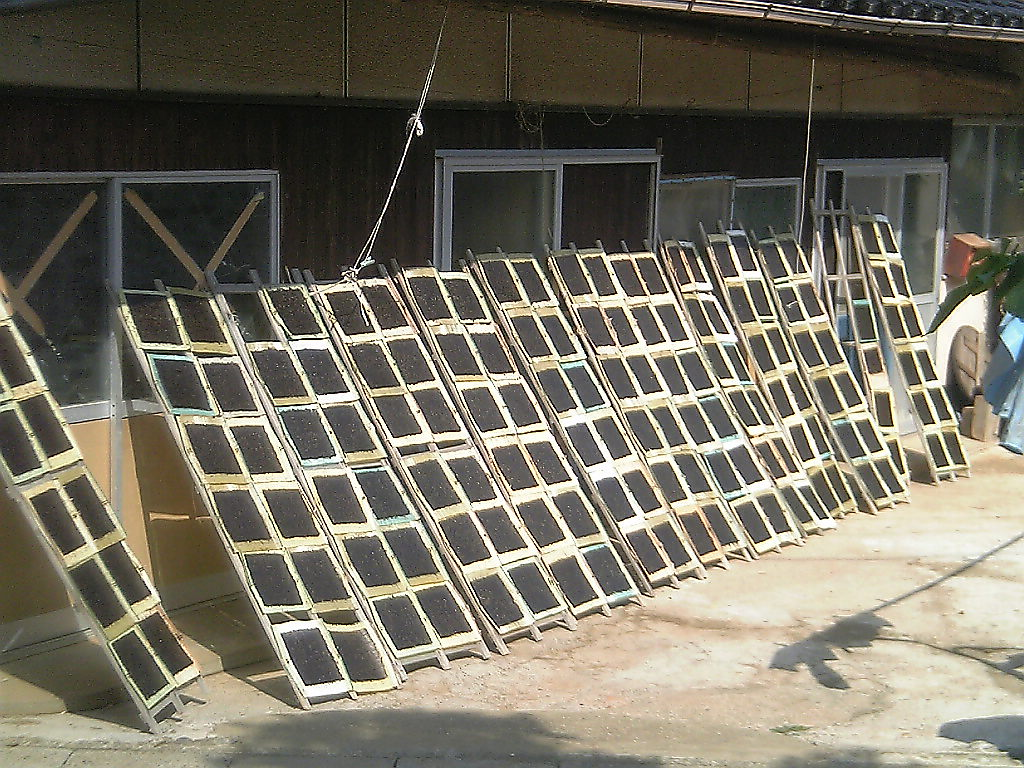
Nori being dried

Mishima (Japanese: 見島, Hepburn: Mishima), is an island in the Hagi Archipelago in Hagi, in Yamaguchi Prefecture in the Chūgoku region of south-western Honshu, Japan. It lies in the Sea of Japan, approximately 44 km (27 mi) from Hagi. It has a surface area of approximately 7.73 km^{2} (2.98 sq mi), and a population of 829 in 458 households.

== Battle of Tsushima ==
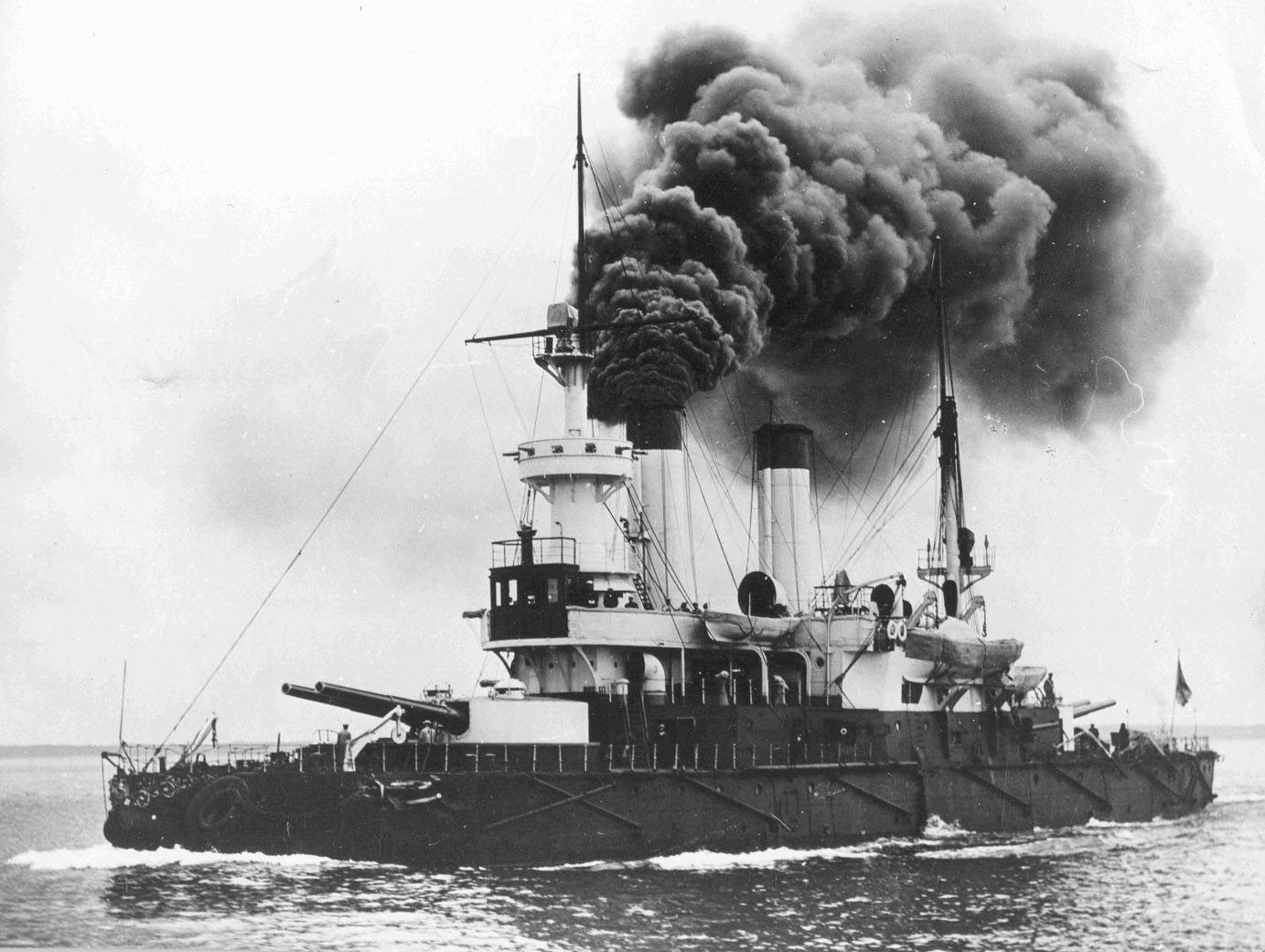
The Admiral Senyavin in 1901; in 1905 it was renamed Mishima.

The Battle of Tsushima between Russian and Japanese forces took place near the island of Mishima on 27–28 May 1905, during the Russo-Japanese War. Nikolai Nebogatov surrendered to the Japanese on 28 May, and his remaining ships were taken. One of these, the Admiral Seniavin, was renamed Mishima when commissioned into the Imperial Japanese Navy.

== Cattle ==
The island is home to the rare and critically-endangered Mishima breed of Japanese native cattle, which was declared a Japanese National Treasure in 1928, and is one of two remaining breeds of Japanese native cattle – the other being the Kuchinoshima breed on Kuchinoshima island in the Tokara Islands.

== Clay ==
The island is the source of Mishima clay, a dark red basaltic clay high in iron, with low plasticity, which was one of the three types of clay used to make Hagi ware.
