= Sites of Japan's Meiji Industrial Revolution: Iron and Steel, Shipbuilding and Coal Mining =

UNESCO World Heritage Site in Japan

UNESCO World Heritage Site
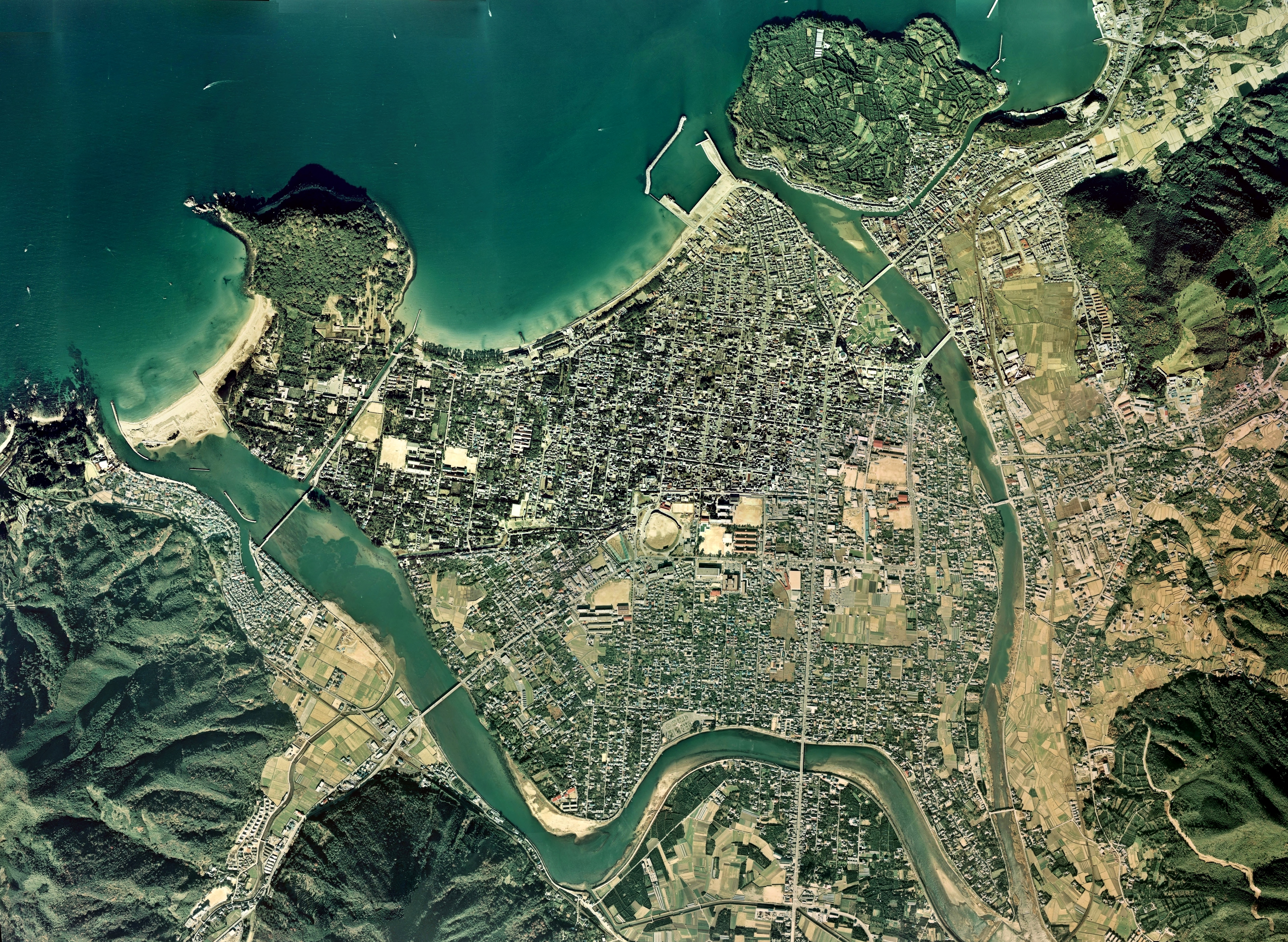
- Aerial photograph of Hagi Castle Town

- Location within Earth
- Location: Japan
- Criteria: Cultural: (ii), (iv)
- Reference: 1484
- Inscription: 2015 (39th Session)
- Area: 306.66 ha (757.8 acres)
- Buffer zone: 2,408.33 ha (5,951.1 acres)
- Coordinates: 34°25′50″N 131°24′44″E

Sites of Japan's Meiji Industrial Revolution: Iron and Steel, Shipbuilding and Coal Mining (明治日本の産業革命遺産 製鉄・鉄鋼、造船、石炭産業, Meiji nihon no sangyōkakumei isan: seitetsu, tekkō, zōsen, sekitan sangyō) are a group of historic sites that played an important part in the industrialization of Japan in the Bakumatsu and Meiji periods (1850s–1910), and are part of the industrial heritage of Japan. In 2009 the monuments were submitted jointly for inscription on the UNESCO World Heritage List under criteria ii, iii, and iv. The sites were accepted at the 39th UNESCO World Heritage session, under the condition to take measures "that allow an understanding that there were a large number of Koreans and others who were brought against their will and forced to work under harsh conditions ...", and again, such measures have yet to be implemented.

Eight areas are registered, with twenty-three component sites:

== Area 1: Hagi in Yamaguchi ==
Hagi proto-industrial sites and Tokugawa period cultural setting; Hagi, Yamaguchi Prefecture:

Site	Comments	Image
Hagi Reverberatory Furnace (萩反射炉, Hagi hansharo) (ID1484-001)	Historic Site	
Ebisugahana Shipyard (恵美須ヶ鼻造船所跡, Ebisugahana zōsenjo ato) (ID1484-002)	Historic Site	
Ohitayama Tatara Iron Works (大板山たたら製鉄遺跡, Ōitayama tatara seitetsu iseki) (ID1484-003)	Prefectural Historic Site	
Hagi castle town (萩城下町, Hagi jōkamachi) (ID1484-004)	Historic Site; Groups of Traditional Buildings	
Shōkasonjuku Academy (松下村塾, Shōkasonjuku) (ID1484-005)	run by Yoshida Shōin; Historic Site	

== Area 2: Kagoshima ==
Shūseikan pioneering factory complex; Kagoshima, Kagoshima Prefecture:

Site	Comments	Image
Former Shūseikan (旧集成館, kyū Shūseikan) (ID1484-006)	Historic Site	
Remains of Shūseikan Reverbatory Furnaces (旧集成館反射炉跡, kyū Shūseikan hansyaro ato)	Historic site	
Shūseikan machine factory (旧集成館機械工場, kyū Shūseikan kikai kōjō)	erected in 1865; Important Cultural Property	
Former Kagoshima spinning engineer's residence (旧鹿児島紡績所技師館, kyū Kagoshima bōsekijo gishi-kan)	erected in 1867; Important Cultural Property	
Terayama Charcoal Kiln (寺山炭窯跡, Terayama sumigama ato) (ID1484-007)	constructed in 1858, Historic site	
Sekiyoshi Sluice gate of Yoshino leat (関吉の疎水溝, Sekiyoshi no sosuikō) (ID1484-008)	constructed in 1852	

== Area 3: Nirayama in Shizuoka ==
Nirayama proto-industrial reverberatory furnace; Izunokuni, Shizuoka Prefecture:

Site	Comments	Image
Nirayama Reverberatory Furnace (韮山反射炉, Nirayama hansharo) (ID1484-009)	started construction in 1853, completed in 1855, Historic Site	

== Area 4: Kamaishi in Iwate ==
Hashino iron mining and smelting site; Kamaishi, Iwate Prefecture:

Site	Comments	Image
Hashino iron mining and smelting site (橋野鉄鉱山, Hashino tekkōzan) (ID1484-010)	influenced Yawata (see below); Historic Site	

== Area 5: Saga ==
Mietsu shipyard; Saga, Saga Prefecture:

Site	Comments	Image
Mietsu Naval Dock (三重津海軍所跡, Mietsu kaigunsho ato) (ID1484-011)	constructed in 1858, Historic Site	

== Area 6: Nagasaki ==
Nagasaki shipyard facilities, coal mining islands and associated sites; Nagasaki, Nagasaki Prefecture:

Site	Comments	Image
Kosuge Slip Dock (小菅修船場跡, Kosuge shūsenba ato) (ID1484-012)	completed in 1868, Historic Site	
Mitsubishi No.3 Dry Dock (三菱長崎造船所 第三船渠, Mitsubishi Nagasaki Zōsenjyo Daisan Senkyo) (ID1484-013)	completed in 1905	
Mitsubishi Senshokaku Guest House (長崎造船所 占勝閣, Nagasaki Zōsenjyo Senshōkaku) (ID1484-014)	completed in 1904	
Mitsubishi Giant Cantilever Crane (長崎造船所 ジャイアント・カンチレバークレーン, Nagasaki Zōsenjo Jaianto Kanchirebā Kurēn) (ID1484-015)	set up in 1909	
Mitsubishi Former Pattern Shop (長崎造船所 旧木型場, Nagasaki Zōsenjo Kyū Kigataba) (ID1484-016)	completed in 1898	
Takashima Coal Mine (高島炭鉱, Takashima tankō) (ID1484-017)	started excavation in 1868, Municipal and Historic Site	
Hashima coal mine (端島炭坑, Hashima tankō) (ID1484-018)	started excavation in 1870, Historic Site	
Glover House and Office (旧グラバー住宅, kyū Gurabā jūtaku) (ID1484-019)	erected in 1863; Important Cultural Property	

== Area 7: Miike in Fukuoka and Kumamoto ==
Miike coal mines, railway and ports; Ōmuta, Fukuoka Prefecture, Arao and Uki, Kumamoto Prefecture:

Site	Comments	Image
Miike Coal Mine and Miike Port (三池炭鉱、三池港, Miike tankō, Miike-kō) (ID1484-020)		
Miike tankō Miyanohara Pit (三池炭鉱 宮原坑, Miike tankō Miyanohara-kō)	no.1 pit completed in 1898, no.2 pit completed in 1901, Important Cultural Property	
Miike tankō Manda Pit (三池炭鉱 万田坑, Miike tankō Manda-kō)	no.1 pit completed in 1902, no.2 pit completed in 1908, Important Cultural Property	
Miike tankō coal mine industrial railway (三池炭鉱 専用鉄道敷跡, Miikekō ・Miike tankō sen'yō tetsudō ato)	opened in 1891, extended to Miike Port in 1905, Important Cultural Property	
Miike Port (三池港, Miike-kō)	opened in 1887, Important Cultural Property, Important cultural landscape	
Misumi West Port (三角西港, Misumi nishi-kō) (ID1484-021)	constructed in 1887, Important Cultural Property	

== Area 8: Yahata in Fukuoka ==
Yawata steel works; Kitakyūshū and Nakama, Fukuoka Prefecture:

Site	Comments	Image
The Imperial Steel Works, Japan (旧官営八幡製鐵所関連施設, kyū kan'ei Yahata seitetsusho kanren shisetsu) (ID1484-022)	establishing political decision was made in 1897, started operation in 1901, "Heritage of Industrial Modernization" by METI.	
The Imperial Steel Works: First Head Office (八幡製鐵所 旧本事務所, Yahata seitetsusho kyū-honjimusyo)	constructed in 1899	
The Imperial Steel Works: Repair Shop (八幡製鐵所 修繕工場, Yahata seitetsusho shūzen-kōjō)	constructed in 1900, the oldest steel structure in Japan, still under operation.	
The Imperial Steel Works: Former Forge Shop (八幡製鐵所 旧鍛冶工場, Yahata seitetsusho kyū-kaji-kōjō)	constructed in 1900	
Onga river Pumping Station (遠賀川水源地ポンプ室, Onga-gawa suigenchi ponpu-shitsu) (ID1484-023)	constructed in 1910, still under operation.	

== Controversy ==
The inclusion of some of these properties as UNESCO Heritage sites raised concerns and objections from South Korea, on the grounds that conscripted Korean civilians and Chinese prisoners-of-war were forced to work under harsh conditions at seven of these sites during Japan's World War II mobilization policies. There is a research questioning about Japanese government's compliance with UNESCO regulations and requirements with respect to Hashima Coal Mine site.

Although the period at which forced labour took place does not coincide with the period of Meiji industrial revolution, the criticism arose based on the view that the Meiji industrial revolution was "inseparable from 20th-century empire-building, which led inexorably to Japanese colonialism and the Asia-Pacific War". South Korea claimed that the official recognition of those sites would "violate the dignity of the survivors of forced labor as well as the spirit and principles of the UNESCO Convention", and "World Heritage sites should be of outstanding universal value and be acceptable by all peoples across the globe." China also released a similar statement that "World Heritage application should live up to the principle and spirit of promoting peace as upheld by UNESCO."

== See also ==
- World Heritage Sites in Japan
- Hidden Christian Sites in the Nagasaki Region
