= Kosuge Slip Dock =

UNESCO World Heritage Site
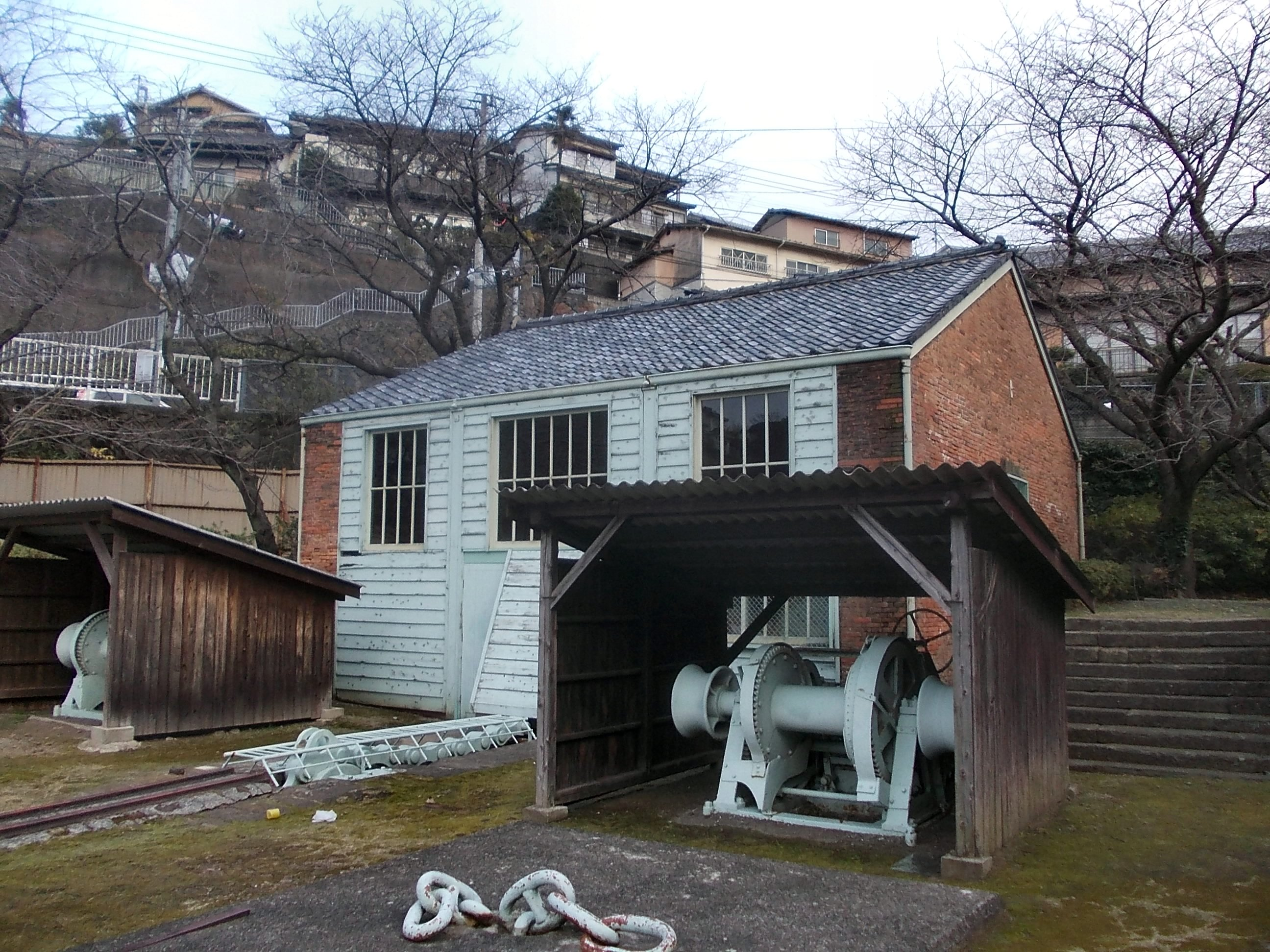
- Kosuge Slip Dock

- Location within Nagasaki Prefecture Location within Japan
- Location: Nagasaki, Nagasaki, Japan
- Part of: Sites of Japan's Meiji Industrial Revolution: Iron and Steel, Shipbuilding and Coal Mining
- Criteria: Cultural: (ii), (iv)
- Reference: 1484
- Inscription: 2015 (39th Session)
- Website: Official website
- Coordinates: 32°43′36.6″N 129°51′44.9″E
- National Historic Site of Japan

Japan’s Meiji Industrial Revolution sites map Nagasaki

The Kosuge Ship Repair Dock (小菅修船場跡, Kosuge shūsen-ba ato) is the remains of Japan's first western-style dock, erected in the Bakumatsu period in what is now the Kosuge neighborhood of the city of Nagasaki of Japan. The site was designated a National Historic Site in 2009. and was later designed as a component of the Sites of Japan's Meiji Industrial Revolution: Iron and Steel, Shipbuilding and Coal Mining, which received UNESCO World Heritage Site status in 2015.

== Overview ==
The Kosuge Slip Dock is the remains of a patent slip-style dry dock for ship repairs, located on the west coast of Nagasaki Port in the western part of Nagasaki City. This style of dock is an inclined plane extending from shoreline into water, featuring a "cradle" onto which a ship is first floated, and a mechanism to haul the ship, attached to the cradle, out of the water onto a slip. It was commonly known as the "Soroban Dock", as the slide used to pull up ships looks like an abacus.

It was constructed by Godai Tomoatsu in 1867, with Komatsu Kiyokado of the trading company Yamato Trading, and British merchant Thomas Blake Glover as investors. All the equipment for the slip dock, including the towing machinery and boilers, was imported from Great Britain, and the manufacturing method for the bricks used on the exterior walls was learned from the Dutch. It was completed in 1868, but was sold in 1869 to the Meiji government and made into an annex of the government-run Nagasaki Ironworks. . In 1872, Emperor Meiji inspected the site in person. In 1884, the main factory, land, buildings, machinery, and all other equipment were sold to Mitsubishi, and became the foundation for the current Mitsubishi Heavy Industries Nagasaki Shipyard. The towing shed, towing machinery, tracks, and stone walls remain in good condition.

It is located approximately 3.7 kilometers southwest of Nagasaki Station, or 1.6 kilometers southwest of the Glover House.

== See also ==
- List of Historic Sites of Japan (Nagasaki)
- Sites of Japan’s Meiji Industrial Revolution: Iron and Steel, Shipbuilding and Coal Mining
