= Hagi Castle =

Coordinates: 34°25′17″N 131°22′53″E

UNESCO World Heritage Site
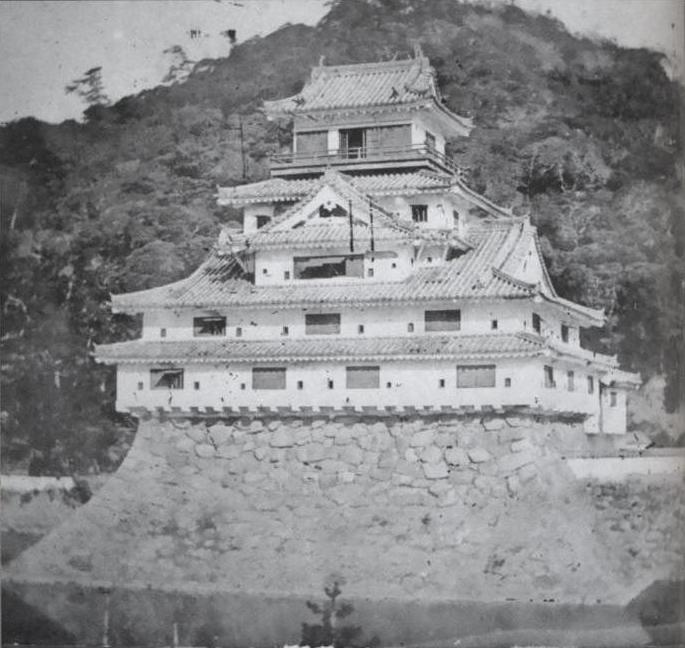
- The tenshu (main keep) of Hagi Castle, in the early Meiji Period

- Location within Yamaguchi Prefecture Location within Japan
- Location: Hagi, Yamaguchi, Japan
- Part of: "Hagi Proto-industrial Heritage / Hagi Castle Town" part of Sites of Japan’s Meiji Industrial Revolution: Iron and Steel, Shipbuilding and Coal Mining
- Criteria: Cultural: (ii), (iv)
- Reference: 1484-004
- Inscription: 2015 (39th Session)
- National Historic Site of Japan

Hagi Castle (萩城, Hagi-jō) is a Japanese castle located in the city of Hagi, Yamaguchi Prefecture, in the San'yō region of Japan. Built in 1604 at the beginning of the Edo period as the main castle of the Mōri clan, it served as the seat of the Chōshū Domain for over 250 years until 1863. It was demolished in 1874 shortly after the Meiji Restoration. Its ruins were designated a National Historic Site in 1924. Hagi Castle has been designed as a component of the Sites of Japan's Meiji Industrial Revolution: Iron and Steel, Shipbuilding and Coal Mining, which received UNESCO World Heritage Site status in 2015.

== Location ==
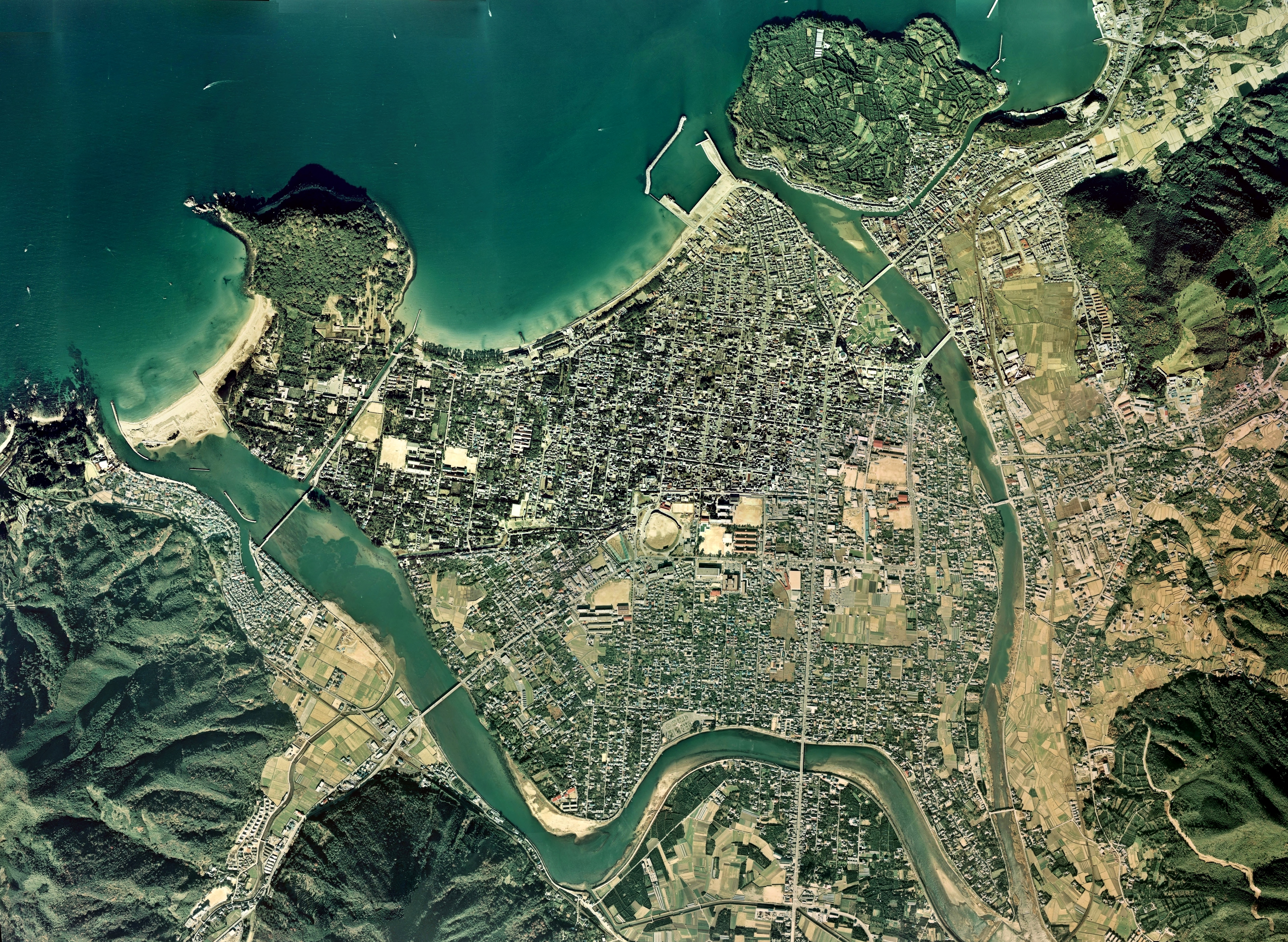
Hagi Castle Town from the air

Hagi Castle is located at the seashore of Hagi city, in northeastern Yamaguchi Prefecture. The Hagi area borders the Sea of Japan and occupies the delta of the Abu River. The edge of the delta is Mount Shigetsu, with an elevation of 150 meters, which was formerly an island but is connected to the land by sandbank. The castle is built on Mount Shigetsu.

Like elsewhere in Japan, a town grew around the castle, and the area is now known as Hagi Castle Town.

== Layout ==
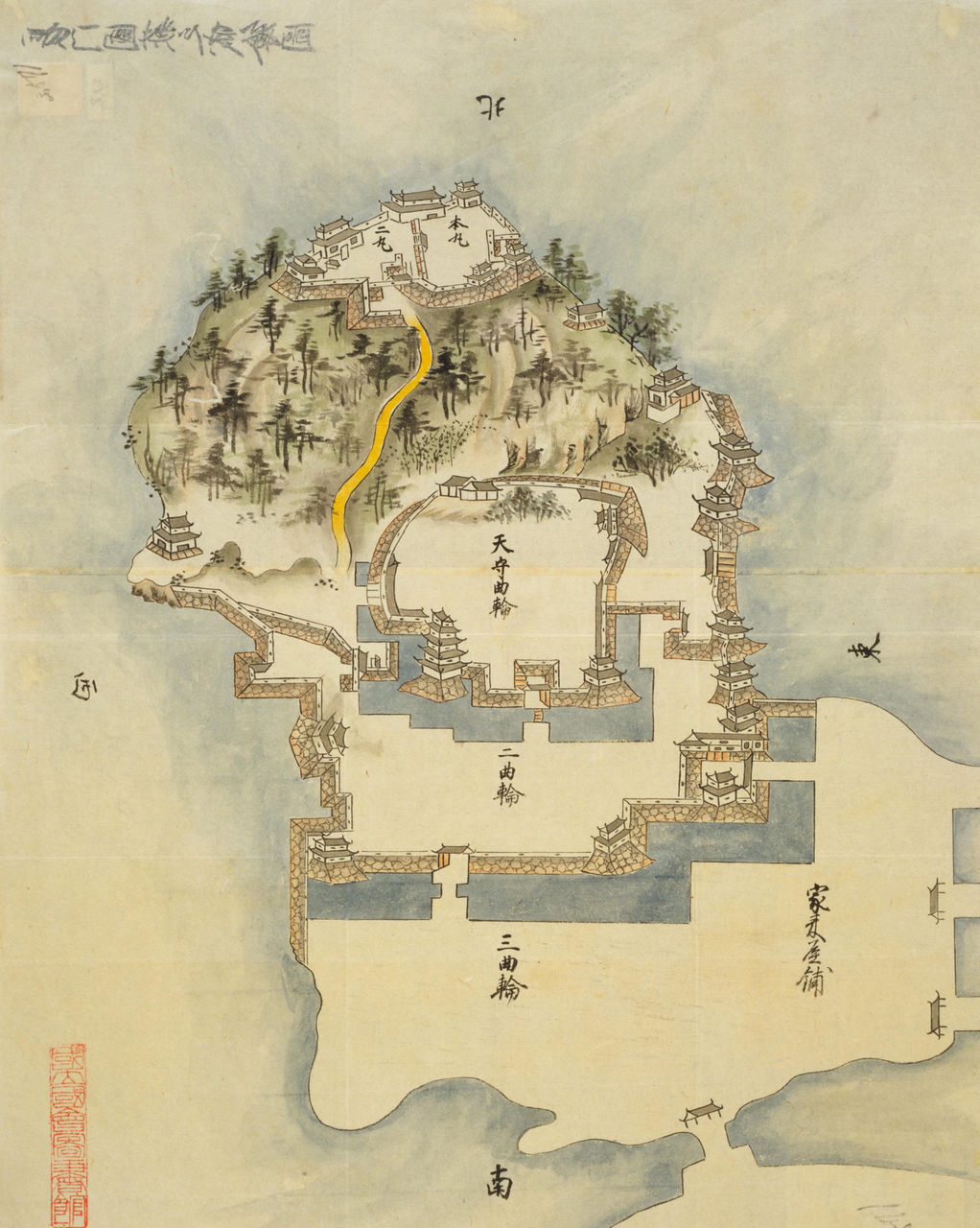
Edo period map of Hagi Castle

Hagi Castle consisted of two square enclosures on Mount Shigetsu and the sandbank connecting it to the mainland. The ocean forms a natural moat on the back side of the castle and a water moat connected to the ocean protects the front. From the landward approach, these enclosures are at an angle, such that a corner of the enclosure faces the mainland to the southeast. Both areas are protected by stone walls and compound gates.

The tenshu (keep) was a five-story structure, and many yagura (turrets) were constructed at intervals on the stone walls. On the mainland was a tertiary area, also protected by moats, for the higher-ranked retainer's residences, and the castle town.

== History ==
=== Founding ===
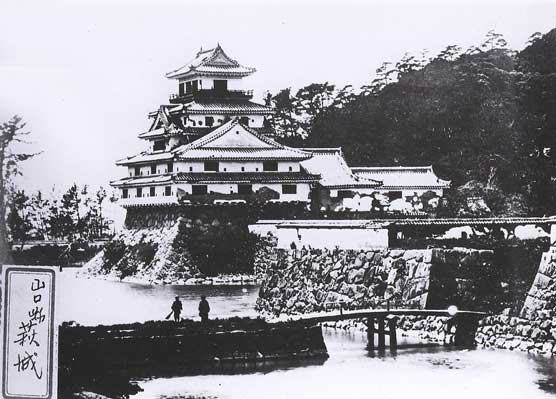
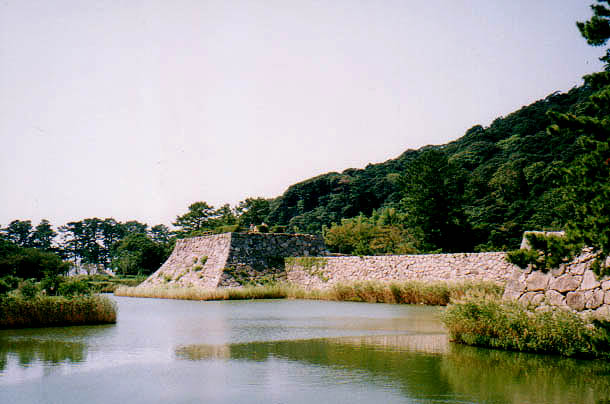
View of the main keep before 1880, and its current ruins

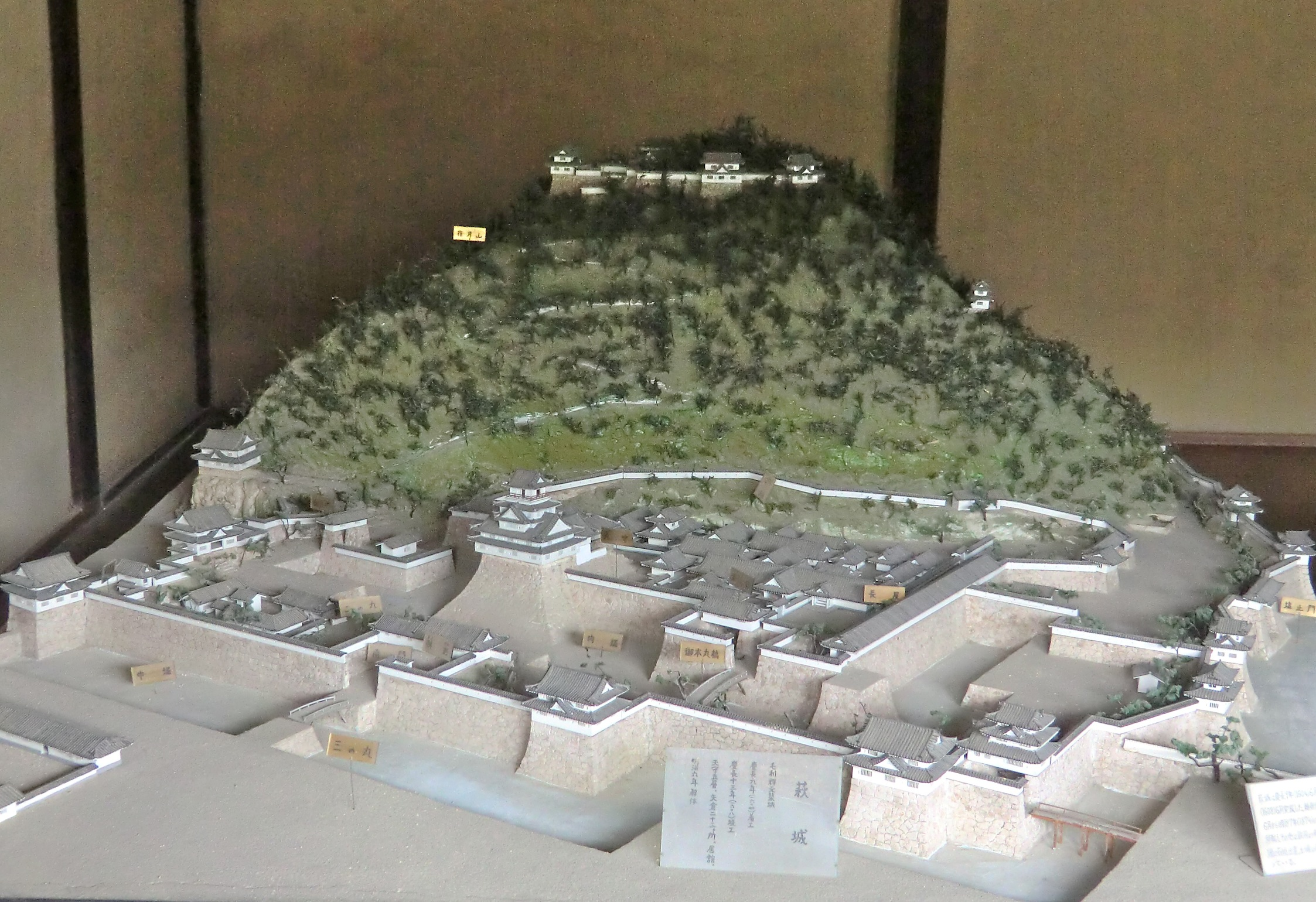
Model of the original castle grounds

The site was originally occupied by a minor fortification erected by the Yoshimi clan, who were based at Tsuwano Castle in Iwami Province. The Yoshimi were retainers of the Ōuchi clan, who were shugo of the provinces on Nagato and Suō from the late Kamakura period. In the mid-Muromachi period, the Ōuchi were overthrown by their own general, Sue Harukata, who was in turn defeated by the Mōri clan.

Mōri Motonari was originally a minor warlord from Aki Province, but after defeating Sue Harutaka and later the Amago clan of Izumo Province, rose to become the ruler of most of the Chugoku region of western Japan. Under his grandson, Mōri Terumoto and with the support of Kikkawa Motoharu and Kobayakawa Takakage, the Mōri continued to expand, but eventually came into conflict with Oda Nobunaga, who general Hashiba Hideyoshi and gradually were forced back into the western half of the Chugoku region. Nobunaga was assassinated before the Mōri could be completely defeated, and agreed to become vassals of his successor, Toyotomi Hideyoshi. Under Toyotomi rule, the Mōri constructed Hiroshima Castle as their main stronghold.

After the death of Hideyoshi, the Mōri supported his son, Toyotomi Hideyori, at the 1600 Battle of Sekigahara against Tokugawa Ieyasu. However, the Mōri did not actually participate in any combat during that battle, as Kikkawa Hiroie was in secret communication with the Tokugawa forces and prevented the Mōri army from receiving orders to move forward. After the battle and the establishment of the Tokugawa shogunate, Tokugawa Ieyasu betrayed his agreement with the Mōri and seized two-thirds of their holdings, including their home province of Aki. Forced back to only Nagato and Suō, the Mōri needed a new stronghold. Initially they petitioned to be allowed to construct their stronghold in either Yamaguchi or Hōfu, which were on the strategic Sanyōdō highway which connected Kyoto with Kyushu. However, the shogunate rejected these proposals and ordered that they build their stronghold at Hagi, which was at the time only a small fishing village, distant from important roads and was a swampy area hemmed in by hills and rivers. Construction of Hagi Castle began in 1604 and was completed in 1608.

Although Chōshū Domain played a major role in the history of Bakumatsu Japan and the Meiji restoration, Hagi Castle was not the site of any major conflict. In 1863, the Mōri clan moved their seat from Hagi Castle to Yamaguchi Castle for fear of attack by foreign naval forces following the Shimonoseki campaign.

=== Destruction and ruins ===
In 1874, most of the castle structures were demolished by order of the new Meiji government and some moats were reclaimed. However, the stone walls of central area and hilltop area remain largely intact, and the outer gate and a corner turret was later restored. The ruins were declared a National Historic Site in 1951, as was Hagi Castle Town in 1967. Mount Shigetsu was designated a National Natural Monument in 1971. In 2006, Hagi Castle was selected as one of Japan's Top 100 Castles by the Japan Castle Foundation in 2006.

It was registered as a UNESCO World Heritage Site on July 5, 2015, as part of the Sites of Japan’s Meiji Industrial Revolution: Iron and Steel, Shipbuilding and Coal Mining. It is registered as part of Hagi's Castle Town.

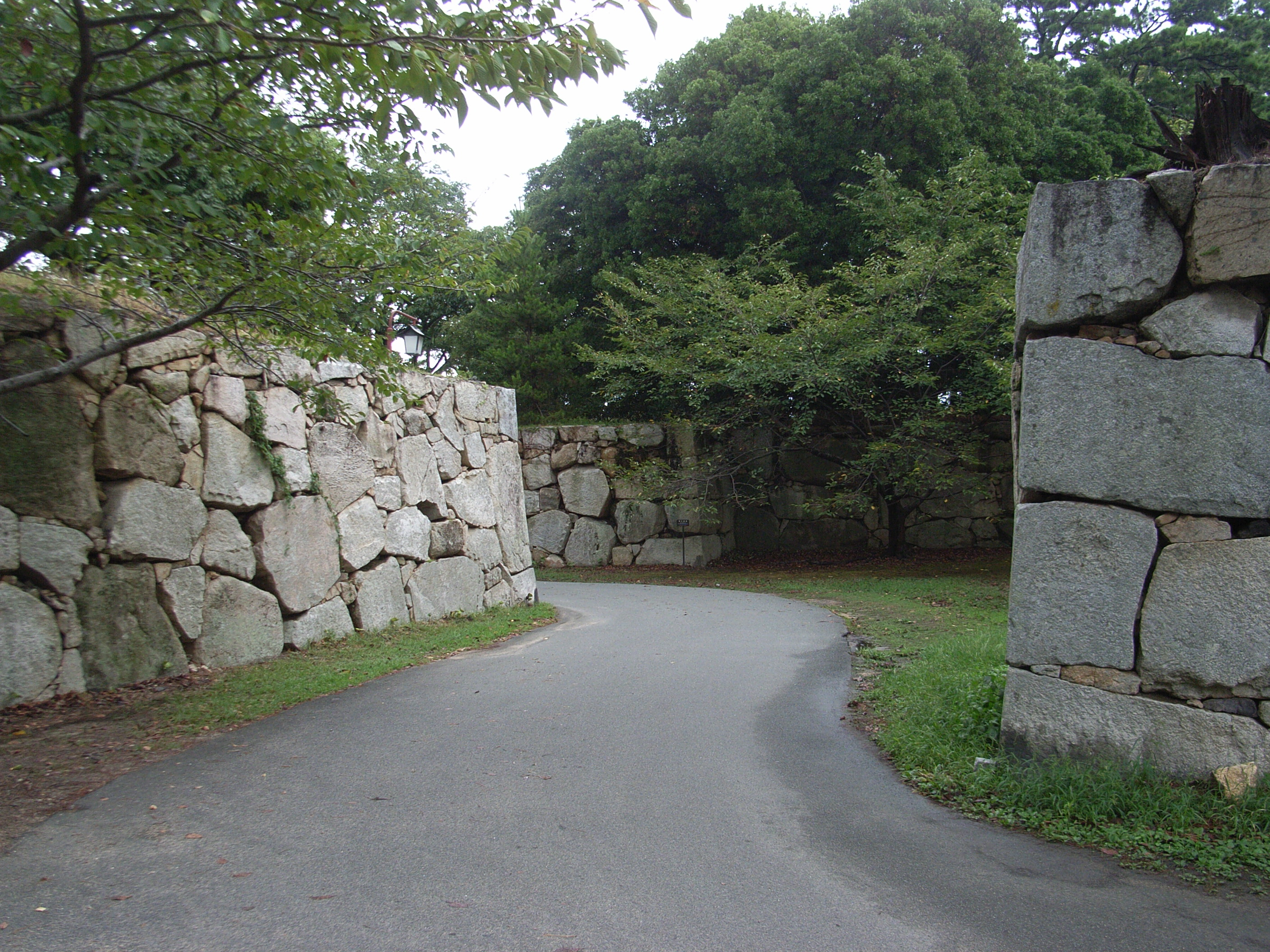
Remaining walls

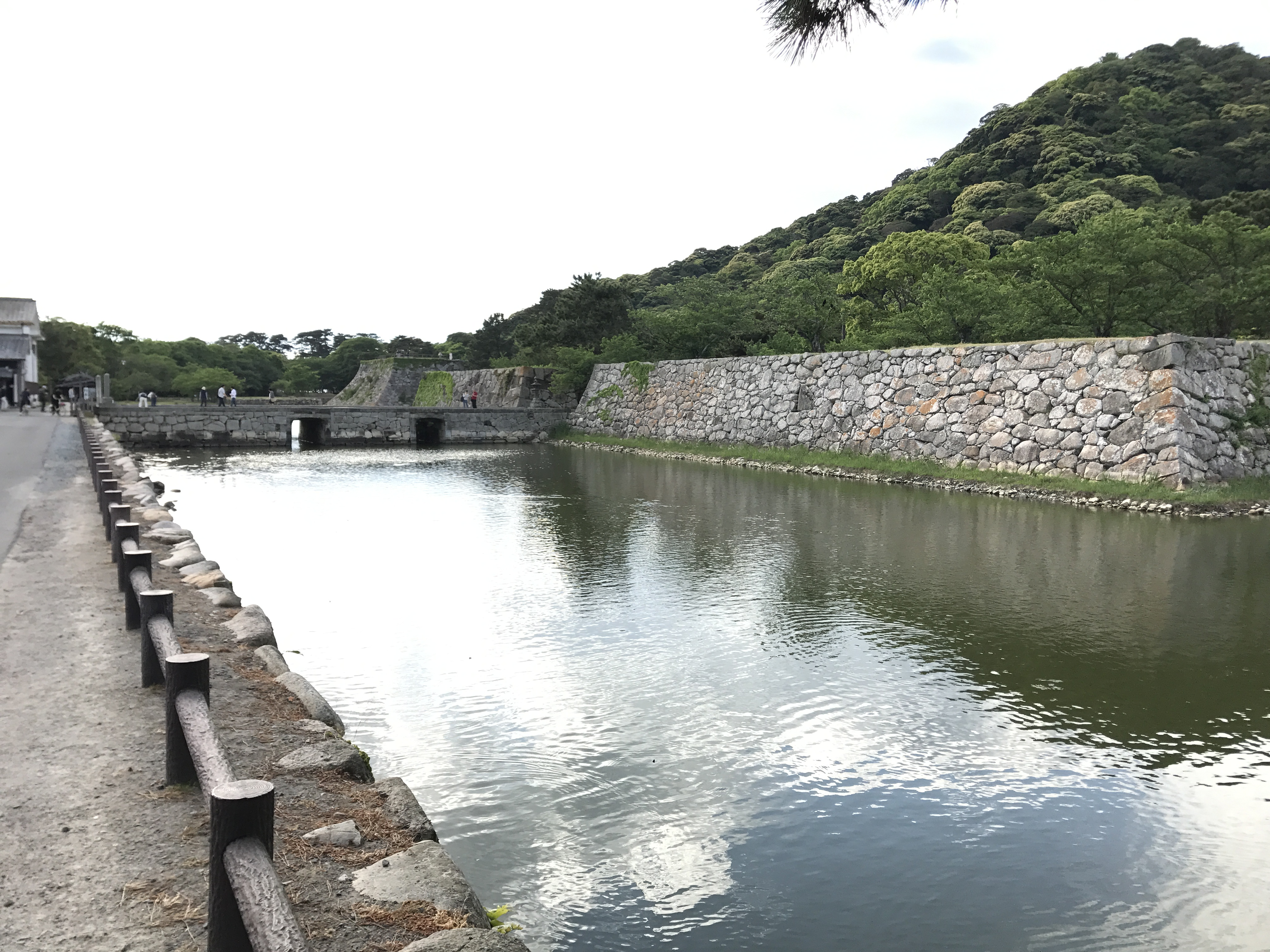
The inner moat

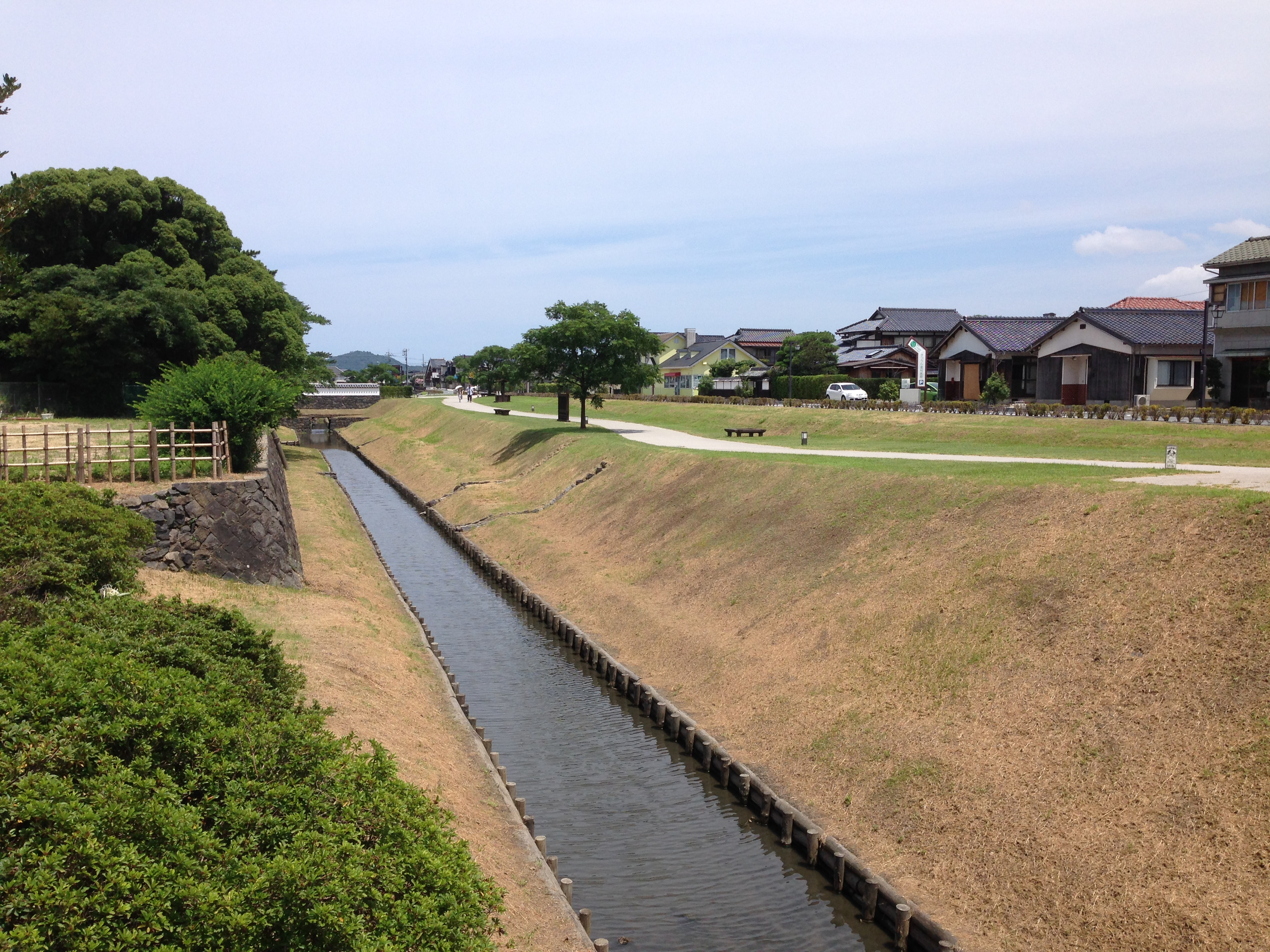
The outer moat

== See also ==
- List of Historic Sites of Japan (Yamaguchi)
- Sites of Japan’s Meiji Industrial Revolution: Iron and Steel, Shipbuilding and Coal Mining

== Literature ==
- De Lange, William (2021). An Encyclopedia of Japanese Castles. Groningen: Toyo Press. pp. 600 pages. ISBN 978-9492722300.
- Schmorleitz, Morton S. (1974). Castles in Japan. Tokyo: Charles E. Tuttle Co. pp. 144–145. ISBN 0-8048-1102-4.
- Motoo, Hinago (1986). Japanese Castles. Tokyo: Kodansha. p. 200 pages. ISBN 0-87011-766-1.
- Mitchelhill, Jennifer (2004). Castles of the Samurai: Power and Beauty. Tokyo: Kodansha. p. 112 pages. ISBN 4-7700-2954-3.
- Turnbull, Stephen (2003). Japanese Castles 1540-1640. Osprey Publishing. p. 64 pages. ISBN 1-84176-429-9.
