= Ohitayama Tatara Iron Works =

UNESCO World Heritage Site
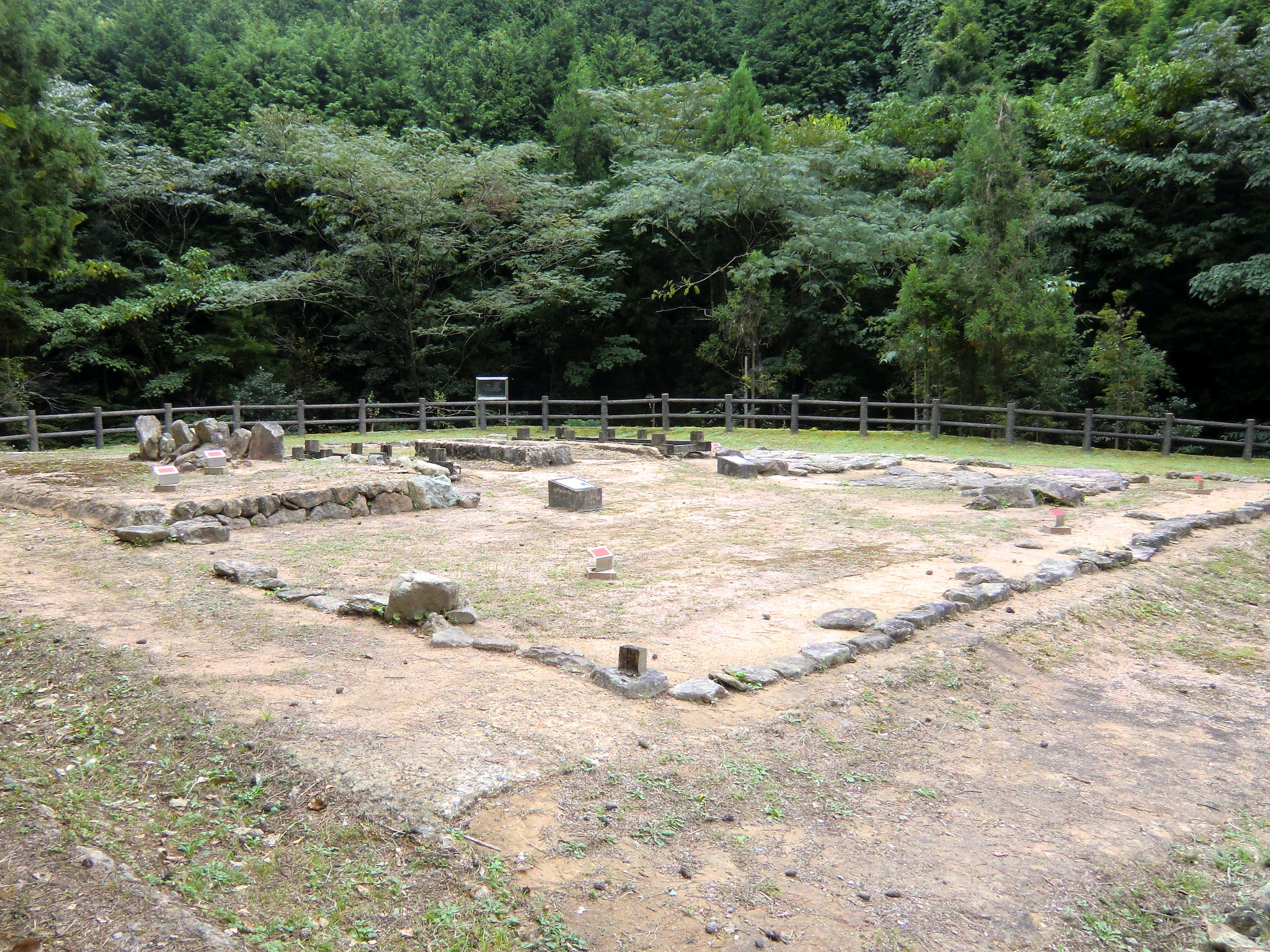
- Ohitayama Tatara Ironworks

- Location within Yamaguchi Prefecture Location within Japan
- Location: Hagi, Yamaguchi, Japan
- Part of: Sites of Japan's Meiji Industrial Revolution: Iron and Steel, Shipbuilding and Coal Mining
- Criteria: Cultural: (ii), (iv)
- Reference: 1484
- Inscription: 2015 (39th Session)
- Coordinates: 34°30′21.6″N 131°32′17.7″E
- National Historic Site of Japan

The Ohitayama Tatara Ironworks (大板山たたら製鉄遺跡, Ōitayama tatara seitetsu iseki) was a premodern steelworks for the production of tatara steel located in the Shibuki neighborhood of the town of Hagi, Yamaguchi Prefecture in the San'yō region of Japan. The site was designated a National Historic Site of Japan in 2012.

== History ==
Tatara (鑪) is a traditional Japanese method of processing iron into steel, which was typically use for making Japanese swords. The process and name first appear in the ancient Kojiki and Nihon Shoki texts from the Nara period. The process is believed to have originated in the Kingdom of Kibi around the middle of the sixth century, spread to various places in Japan. A low box-shaped furnace containing a clay tub is constructed and heated with charcoal until the correct temperature is reached. It is then filled with alternating layers of ironsand and charcoal over a 72-hour period, with the entire process taking up to a week. Once the iron has converted to steel, the clay vessel is broken and the steel bloom removed. Typically ten tons of iron sand yield 2.5 tones of tamahagane, or raw steel. This smelting process thus differs considerably from that of the modern mass production of steel, and also differs from contemporary Chinese and Korean methods. In the Kamakura period and Muromachi period, furnaces increased in size to produce more steel of higher quality, with underground tunnels to more evenly distribute heat and reduce humidity. In the Edo Period, foot-operated blowers blow a large amount of air into the furnace to increase the temperature were introduced. However, following the introduction of Western technologies after the Meiji restoration, the traditional furnaces were no longer economically viable, and soon disappeared.

The Ohitayama Tatara Ironworks ruins are located in the upper reaches of the Yamaguchi River, a tributary of the Ōi River. It operated intermittently during the Bakumatsu period and was the largest metallurgical site in Yamaguchi Prefecture. The iron produced here was used in the construction of Western-style warships, making it a unique example in which Japan's unique iron-making technology was used in Western-style shipbuilding. The site is half submerged by a dam; however, the main part of the ironworks survived in the northern half of the site and was excavated from 1900 to 1996. The ironworks used iron sand and charcoal from the nearby Chugoku Mountains as raw materials. It was in operation for three periods:

- Eight years in the Horeki period (1751-1764)
- Ten years in the Bunka and Bunsei periods (1812-1822)
- Twelve years in the Bakumatsu period (1855-1867)

Iron from this location was used in the Heishin Maru, the first Western-style warship of the Chōshū navy, which was built at the nearby Ebisugahana Shipyard.

The site is about 30 minutes by car from Higashi-Hagi Station on the JR West San'in Main Line.[

== Gallery ==
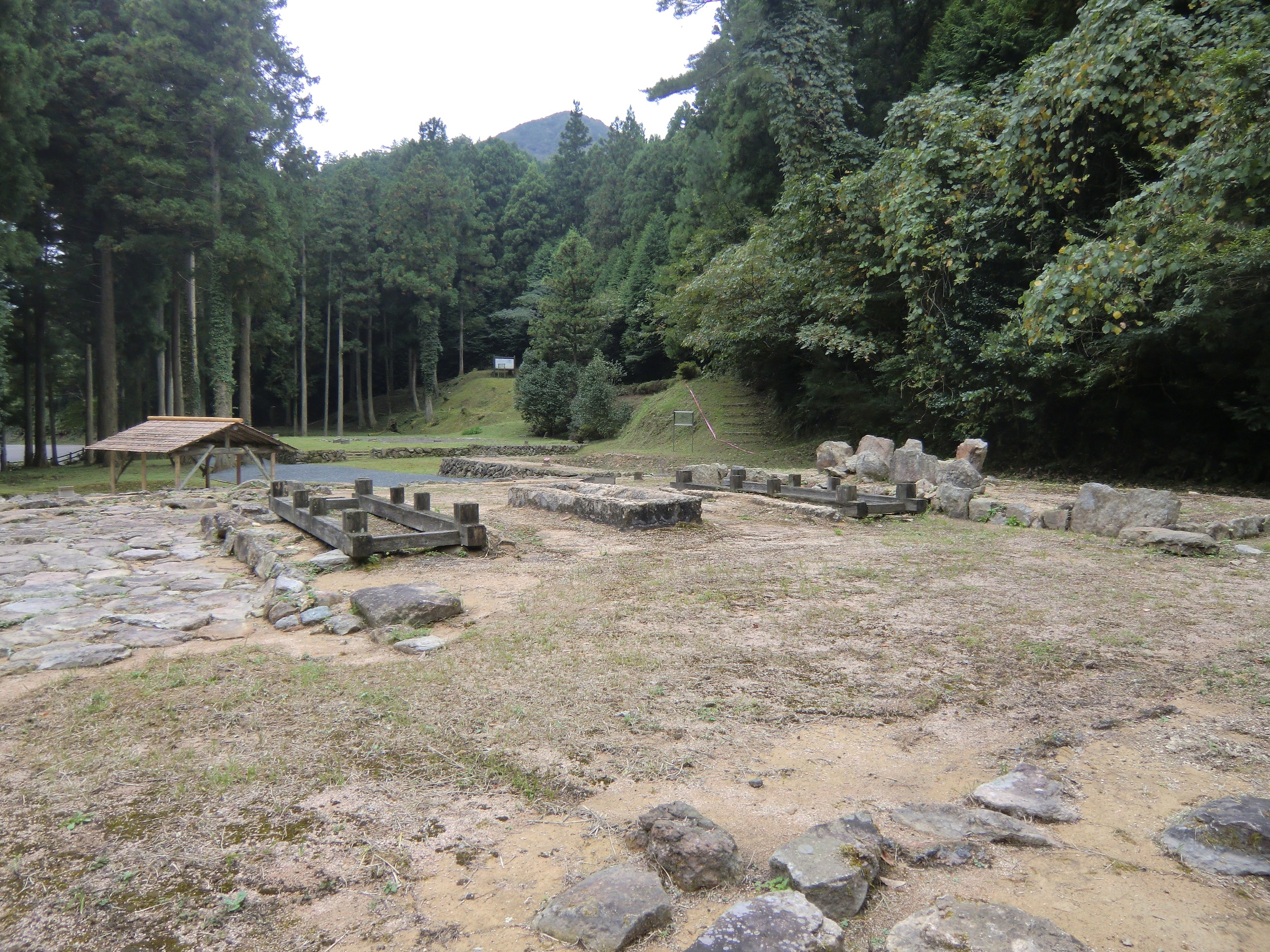
Panorama

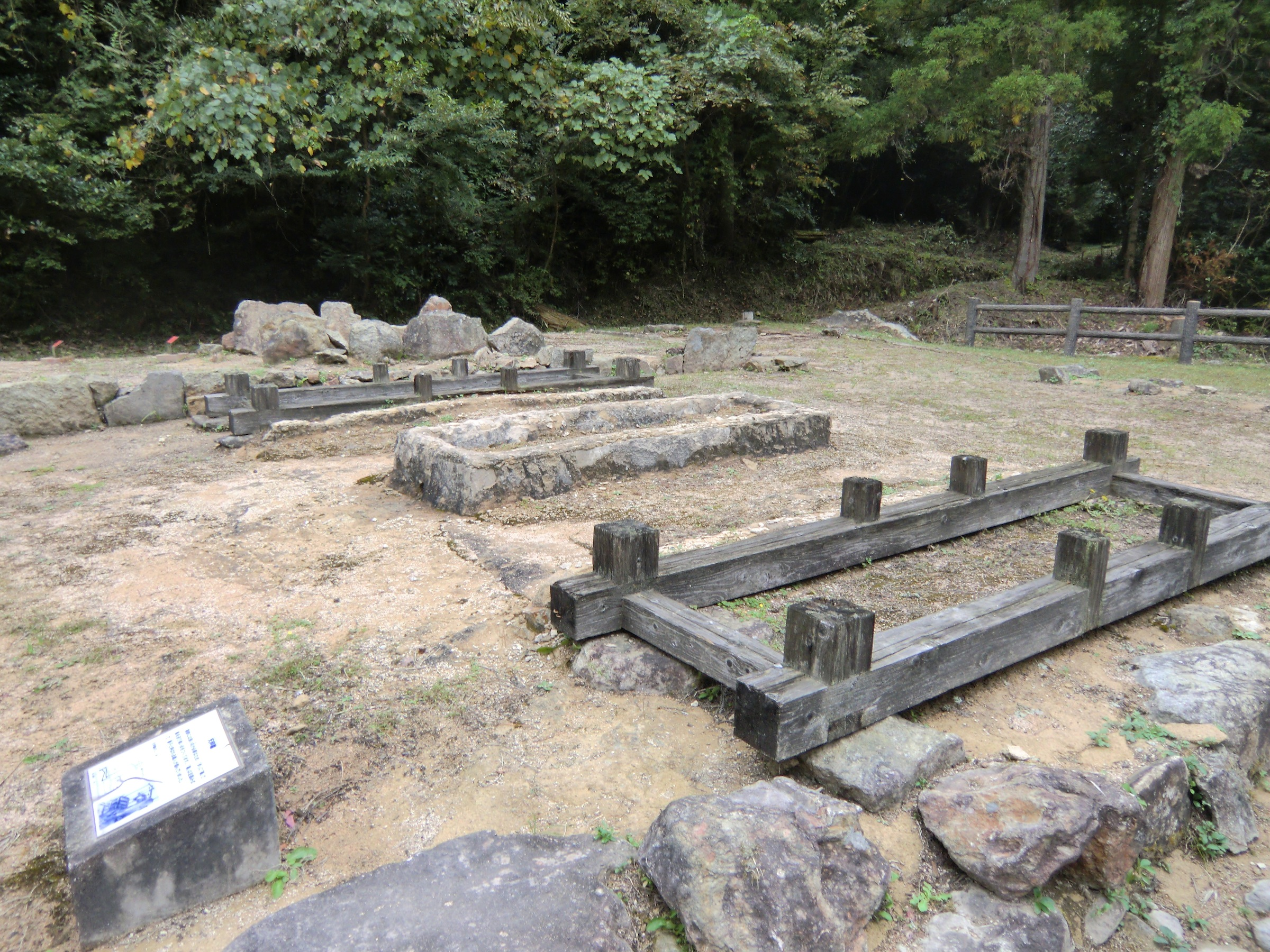
Foundations of furnace

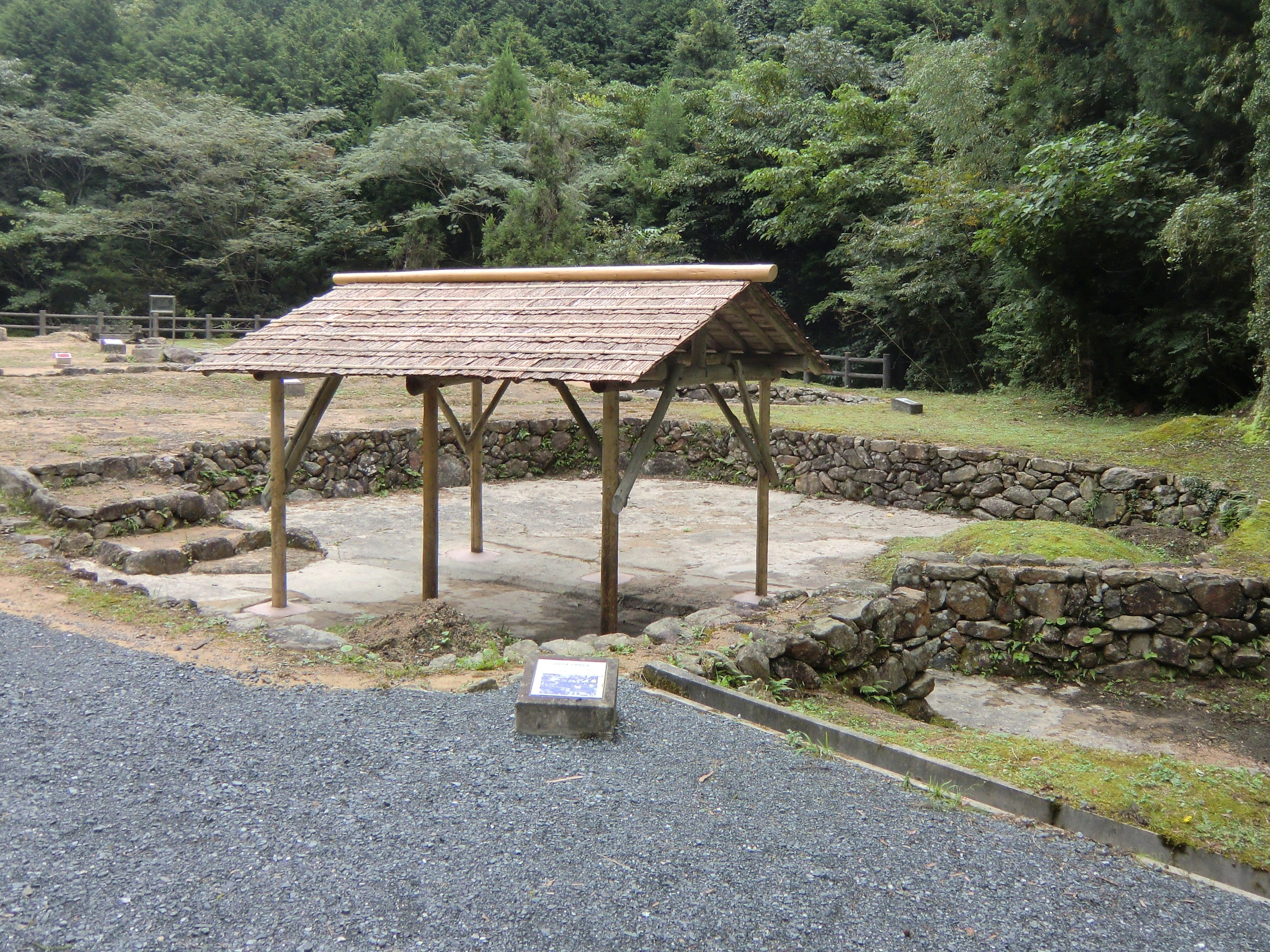
Iron sand washing place

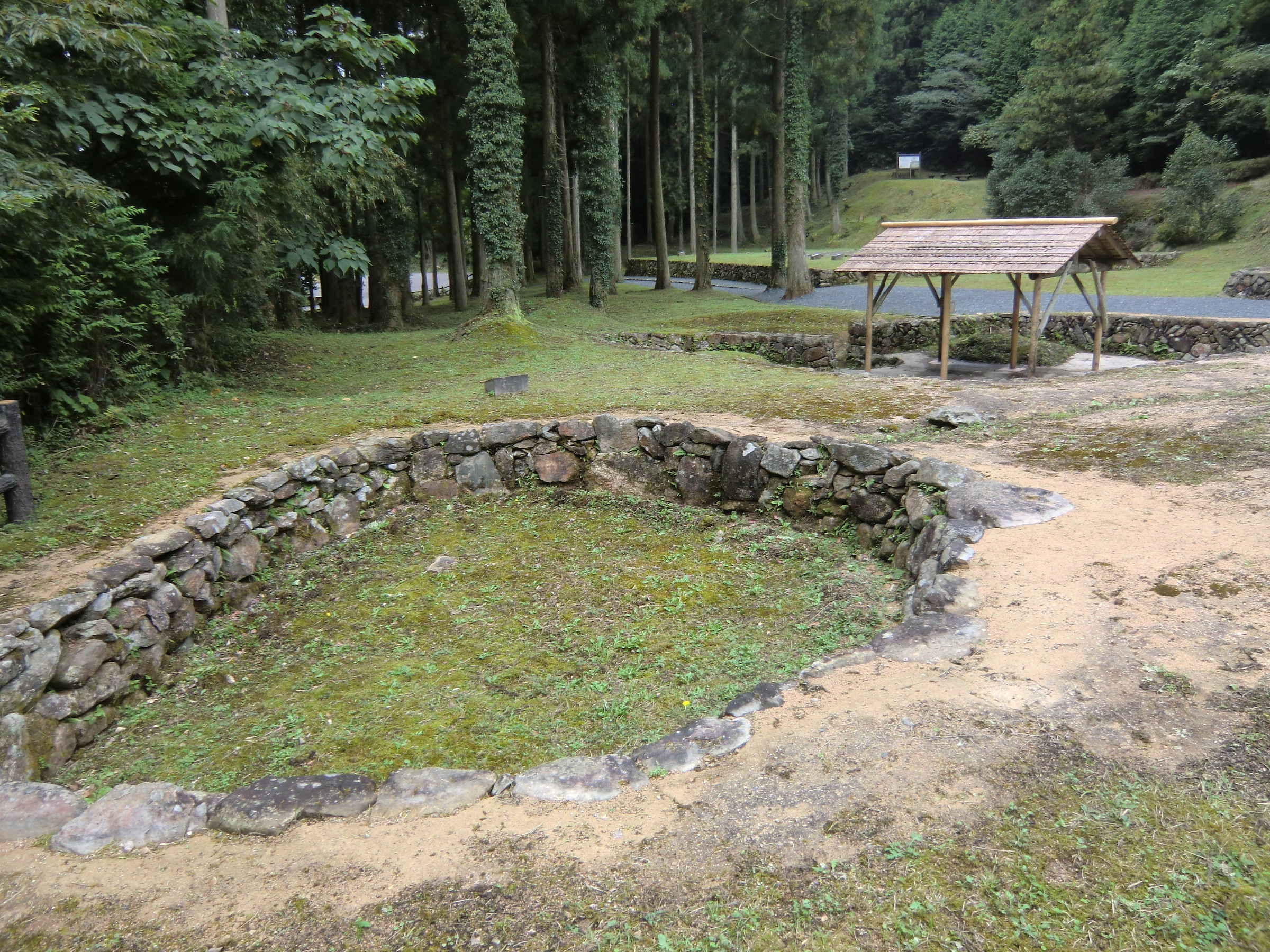
Iron pond

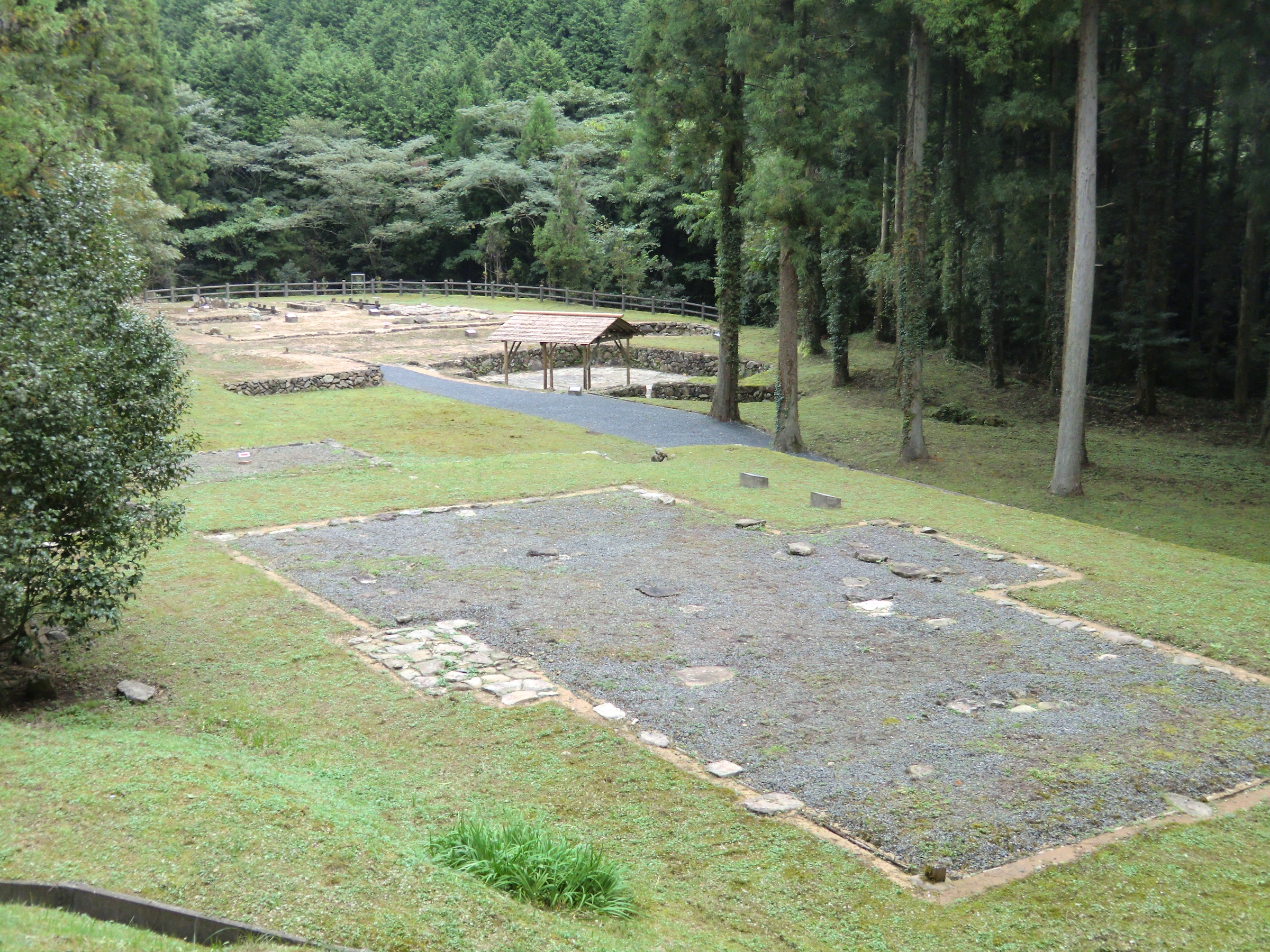
Foundation of blacksmith hut

== See also ==
- List of Historic Sites of Japan (Yamaguchi)
