= Mishima cattle =

Japanese breed of cattle

Mishima
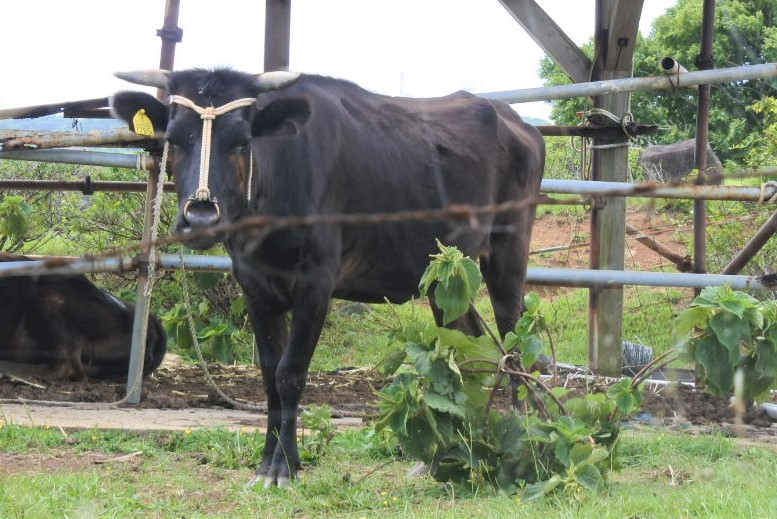
- Conservation status: FAO (2007): critical
- Other names: Japanese: 見島牛; Mishima ushi
- Country of origin: Japan
- Distribution: Mishima Island, Yamaguchi
- Use: meat

Traits
- Weight: Male: 600 kg (1300 lb); Female: 400 kg (900 lb)
- Height: Male: 125 cm (50 in); Female: 115 cm (45 in)
- Coat: black
- Horn status: horned in both sexes

Notes
- designated as a National Treasure

The Mishima (Japanese: 見島牛, Mishima ushi) is a critically-endangered Japanese breed of beef cattle. It is found only on Mishima Island, some 50 km (31 mi) north-west of Hagi, in Yamaguchi Prefecture, Japan. It is one of six native Japanese cattle breeds, and one of two small populations that have never been cross-bred with Western cattle, the other being the Kuchinoshima breed from Kuchinoshima island in the Tokara Island group.

== History ==
Cattle were brought to Japan from China at the same time as the cultivation of rice, in about the second century AD, in the Yayoi period. Until about the time of the Meiji Restoration in 1868, they were used only as draught animals, in agriculture, forestry, mining and for transport, and as a source of fertiliser. Milk consumption was unknown, and – for cultural and religious reasons – meat was not eaten. Cattle were highly prized and valuable, too expensive for a poor farmer to buy.

Japan was effectively isolated from the rest of the world from 1635 until 1854; there was no possibility of intromission of foreign genes to the cattle population during this time. Between 1868, the year of the Meiji Restoration, and 1887, some 2600 foreign cattle were imported. At first there was little interest in cross-breeding these with native stock, but from about 1900 it became widespread. It ceased abruptly in 1910, when it was realised that, while the cross-breeds might be larger and have better dairy qualities, their working capacity and meat quality was lower. Among the various heterogeneous regional populations that resulted from this brief period of cross-breeding, four separate strains were characterised, and were recognised as breeds in 1944. These were the four wagyū breeds, the Japanese Black, the Japanese Brown and the Japanese Polled and the Japanese Shorthorn.

The Mishima is one of two small isolated groups which escaped the process of hybridisation; the other is the Kuchinoshima breed from Kuchinoshima island in the Tokara Island group. Together they represent the only surviving remnant of the native cattle population of Japan.

The Mishima was designated a Japanese National Treasure in 1928.

Its conservation status was listed by the FAO as "critical" in 2007. In 2004 the total population was reported to be 108.
