= Hagi Reverberatory Furnace =

UNESCO World Heritage Site
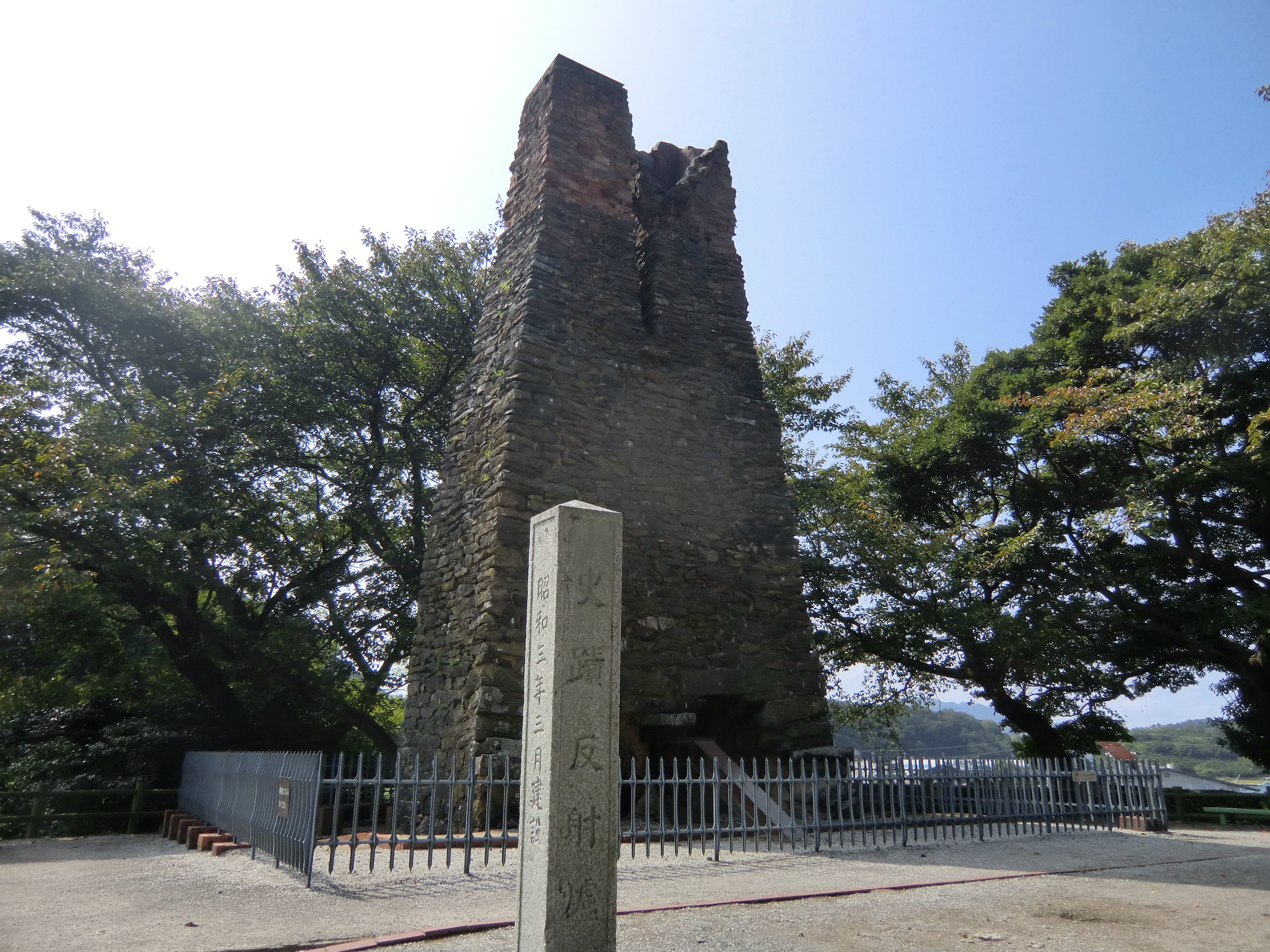
- Remains of the reverberatory furnace chimney

- Location within Yamaguchi Prefecture Location within Japan
- Location: Hagi, Yamaguchi, Japan
- Part of: Sites of Japan's Meiji Industrial Revolution: Iron and Steel, Shipbuilding and Coal Mining
- Criteria: Cultural: (ii), (iv)
- Reference: 1484
- Inscription: 2015 (39th Session)
- Coordinates: 34°25′41.35″N 131°25′5.87″E
- National Historic Site of Japan

The Hagi Reverberatory Furnace (萩反射炉, Hagi hansharo) is the ruins of an Edo period reverberatory furnace erected by Chōshū Domain in what is now the Chintō neighborhood of the city of Hagi, Yamaguchi in the San'yō region of Japan. The site was designated a National Historic Site in 1924. and was later designed as a component of the Sites of Japan's Meiji Industrial Revolution: Iron and Steel, Shipbuilding and Coal Mining, which received UNESCO World Heritage Site status in 2015.

== Background ==
During the Bakumatsu period, the Tokugawa shogunate was increasingly alarmed by incursions by foreign warships into Japanese territorial waters, fearing that these kurofune warships would attempt the end Japan's self-imposed national isolation policy by force, or would attempt an invasion of Japan by landing hostile military forces. Numerous feudal domains were ordered to establish fortifications along their coastlines with coastal artillery located at strategic locations, and the shogunate made belated attempts to modernize its armed forces with western weaponry. Chōshū Domain decided to construct a facility to cast Western-style iron cannons, and dispatched a technical team to Saga Domain in July 1855. Saga Domain was a leader in this field and already had an operational reverberatory furnace; however Saga Domain was reluctant to share much information with Chōshū. The following year a second team was sent from Chōshū to Saga, this time with a request to construct a new gun mount which had been invented by Chōshū engineers. Through negotiations, the Chōshū team was allowed to make a sketch of the reverberatory furnace and returned with this information to Hagi, where a test furnace was immediately constructed. This test furnace is known to have been in operation to 1858, but a full-scale reverberatory furnace was never completed.

This site contains the remnants of the reverberatory furnace chimney, which is 10.5 meters high. Part of the upper part is brick masonry, and the lower part is made of andesite and red clay. About five meters from the top, it appears to be divided into two branches, but in reality these are two independent chimneys side-by-side. Two hearth remains have also been excavated, and it is believed that the west hearth was the one mainly used. When casting cannons, a frustum (rotating flat cone) is used to hollow out the inside of the cannon barrel, but no trace of the irrigation channels necessary for the water wheel to power such a device has been found. Together with the lack of any historical records of any cannon produced at this site, it can be concluded that this reverberatory furnace was used for testing, but not for actual production. As with the Nirayama Reverberatory Furnace in Izunokuni, Shizuoka, the design of this furnace appears to have been taken from a Dutch book, Het Gietwezen in's Rijks Ijzer - geschutgieterij te Luik, which the Japanese had received via the Dutch trading post at Nagasaki. The height of the chimney described in that book is 16 meters, making the Hagi Reverberatory Furnace a 70 percent scale model.

The site is about three minutes by car from JR West Higashi-Hagi Station.

== See also ==
- List of Historic Sites of Japan (Yamaguchi)
- Sites of Japan’s Meiji Industrial Revolution: Iron and Steel, Shipbuilding and Coal Mining
