= Takashima Coal Mine =

Defunct coal mine in Kyushu, Japan

Takashima Coal Mine 高島炭鉱
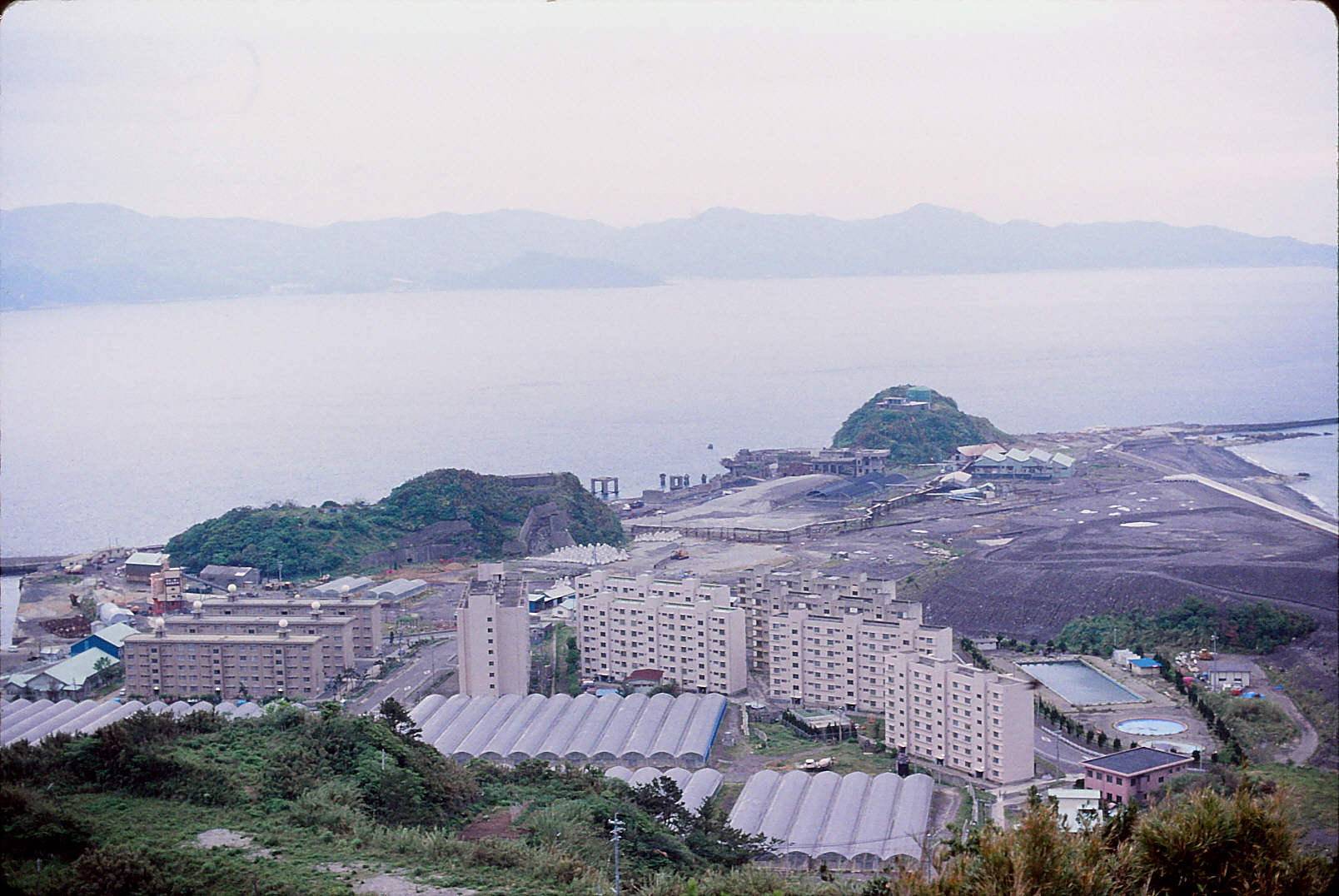
- Takashima Coal Mine

- Location within Nagasaki Prefecture
- Location: Nagasaki, Nagasaki, , Japan; 32°39′14″N 129°45′19.4″E
- Products: Coal
- Closed: 1986
Takashima Coal Mine
UNESCO World Heritage Site
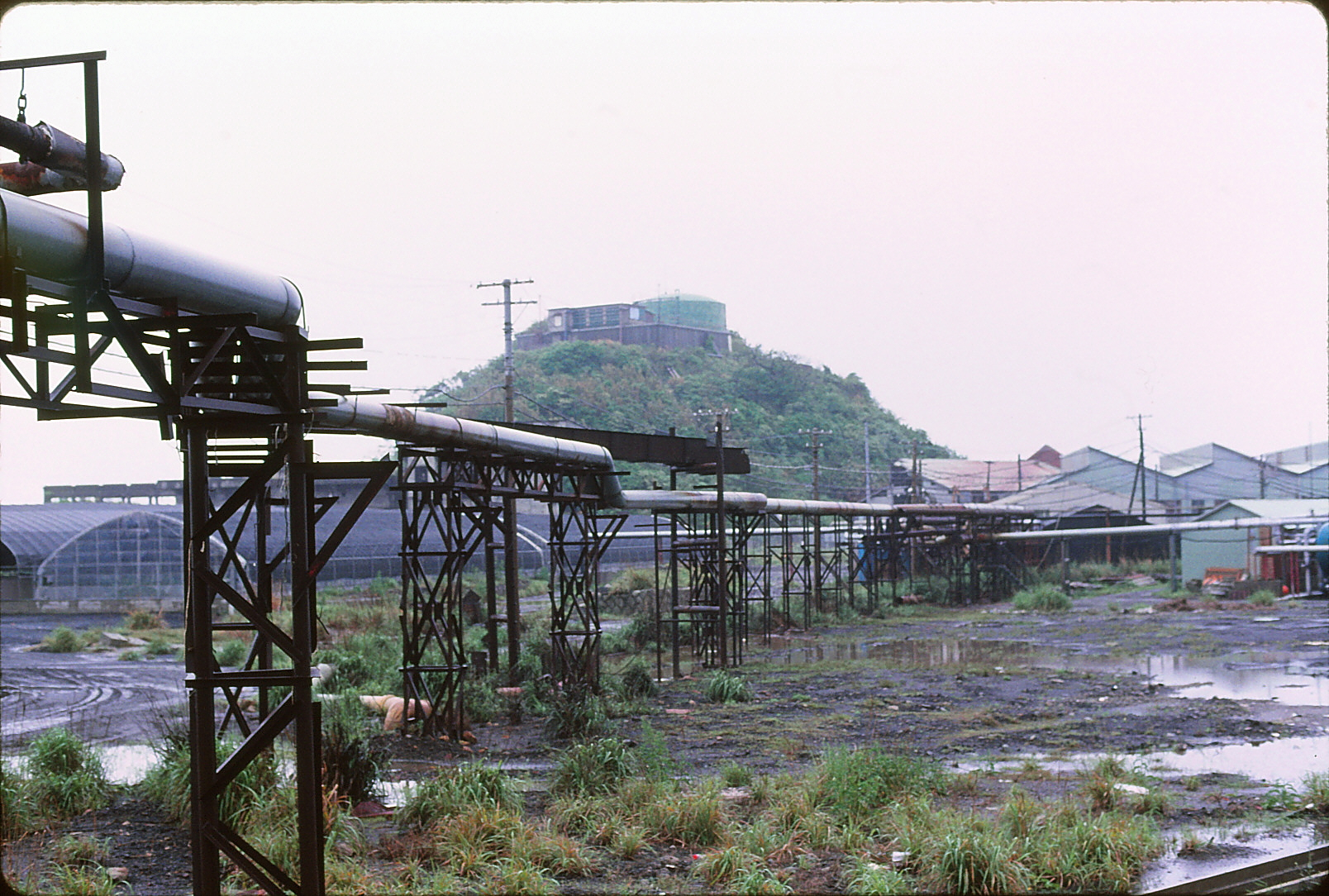
- Mitsubishi Takashima Coal Mine

- Location within Earth
- Location: Japan
- Criteria: Cultural: (ii), (iv)
- Reference: 1484
- Inscription: 2015 (39th Session)

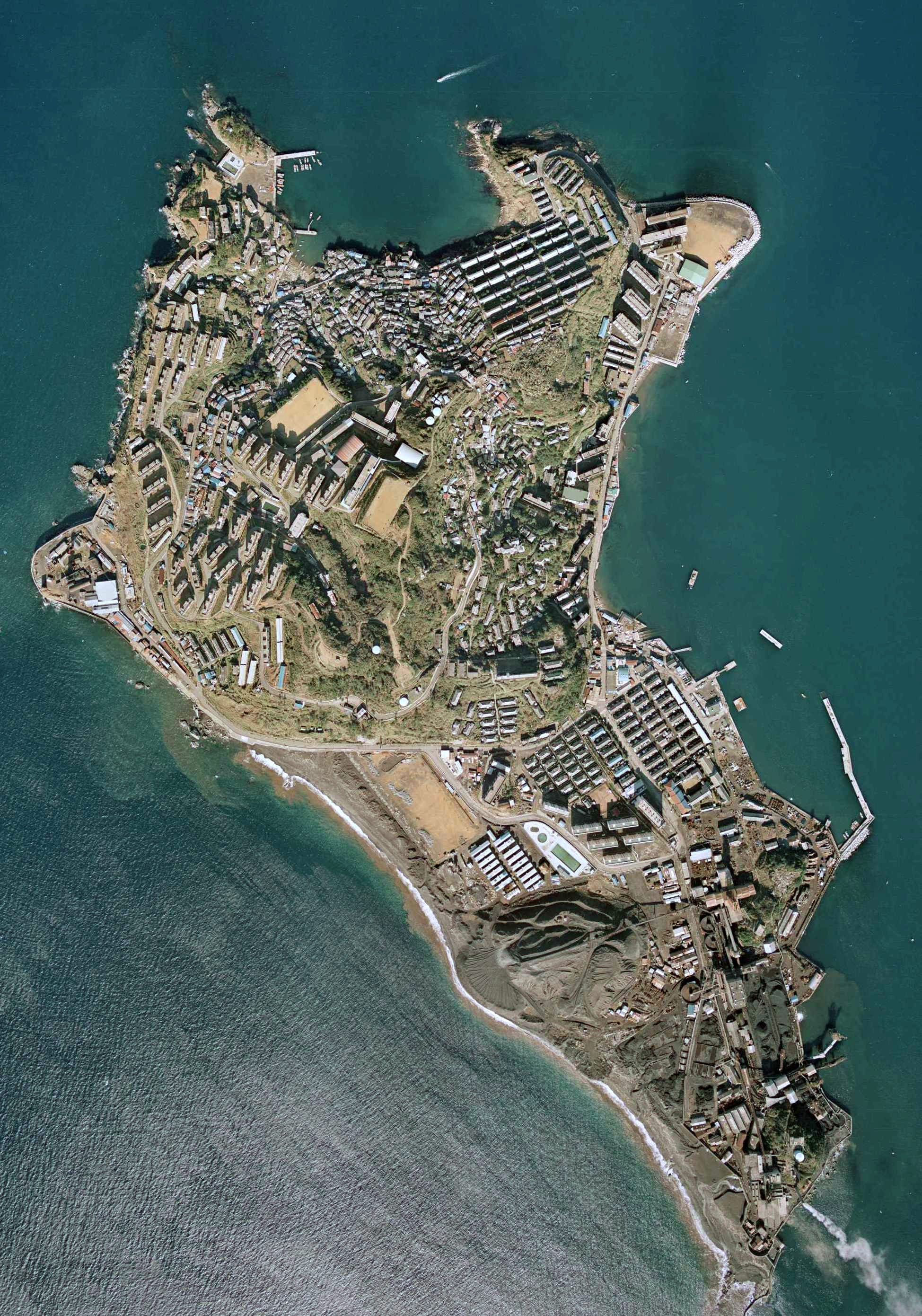
Takashima island

Takashima coal mine (高島炭鉱, Takashima Tankō) was a coal mine in Japan, located on the island of Takashima off the northern shore of the Nagasaki Peninsula. It was known as the town of Takashima but is now part of the city of Nagasaki, Nagasaki Prefecture. The entire 1.23 square kilometre island, including the areas under the ocean off the coast of the island, was a coal mine. There were 22 mining shafts covering 12,480 hectares. 80% of the coal produced was considered high-quality coking coal, which was consumed in Kyushu and Osaka for gas and coke. The mine was closed on November 27, 1986. It was designated a National Historic Site in 2014.

Along with the Hashima Coal Mine, it was registered as one of the assets of the UNESCO Sites of Japan's Meiji Industrial Revolution: Iron and Steel, Shipbuilding and Coal Mining World Heritage Site in 2015.

== Overview ==
The Takashima Coal Mine began operations in 1695 when a coal seam was discovered in Matsuura County, Hizen Province. This coal was first exploited by Hirado Domain and shipped to customers in Osaka and the Chugoku region. It was also used as fuel in nearby salt farms and as fuel for ceramics, such as Hasami ware.

In 1868, during the Bakumatsu period, Saga Domain and Scottish merchant Thomas Blake Glover, established a joint venture and excavated Japan's first Western-style vertical shaft powered by steam engines (the Hokkei-i Pit). With the end of the national isolation policy, the demand for coal as fuel for foreign steamships calling at Nagasaki increased. In the Meiji period, Gotō Shōjirō purchased the mine from the Saga Domain and began operations. British mining engineer, Erasmus Gower, tried to modernize it but failed. In 1881, operations of the mine were taken over by the Mitsubishi Zaibatsu led by Iwasaki Yatarō, who was also from Tosa Domain, and full-scale mining began. On April 25, Iwasaki bought out Gotō's shares, and in return, he paid off Gotō's outstanding debt of 250,000 yen to the Meiji government. Since then, along with the nearby Nakanoshima coal mine and Hashima coal mine, it was run by various companies within the Mitsubishi conglomerate and was a major supplier for Japan's energy needs into the twentieth century.

The Takashima mine was infamous for its employment system, which included exploitation by the company and foremen. With inhumane working conditions, "troublemakers" and workers attempting to flee were being lynched to death as a warning to others. These conditions were made known nationwide in an exposé in 1888 by Matsuoka Koichi, a reporter who had worked in the mines himself and was a former supervisor at the Takashima coal mine. The article, entitled "The Tragedy of the Takashima Coal Mine", were published in the magazine Nihonjin (Issues 6–14) and sparked a nationwide campaign. As a result of frequent riots by workers, the employment conditions at the Takashima coal mine were reformed in 1897. However, the poor living conditions in company-run dormitories persisted until after World War II. In 1906, a coal dust explosion occurred at the Kakise Pit, resulting in 307 deaths and injuries.

In 1963, the 965-meter-deep Futago Shaft was completed at a cost of 16 billion yen to mine coal from deep areas, but it was abandoned in 1973 due to poor conditions which including a steep incline of 36 degrees, high temperatures and frequent gas outflows. The mining volume peaked in 1966. By 1965, the company had grown to 3,000 employees and production of 1.27 million tons of coal. However, due to the shift from coal to oil, demand for coal decreased, and by 1985, both the number of employees and coal production had halved. In addition, a dust explosion accident occurred in the same year, and the mine was closed in 1986 as part the first industrial restructuring measure to resolve trade friction between Japan and the United States. The accumulated deficit at that time was 35 billion yen.

== See also ==
- Sites of Japan's Meiji Industrial Revolution: Iron and Steel, Shipbuilding and Coal Mining
- List of Historic Sites of Japan (Nagasaki)
