= Kuchinoshima cattle =

Japanese breed of cattle

Kuchinoshima
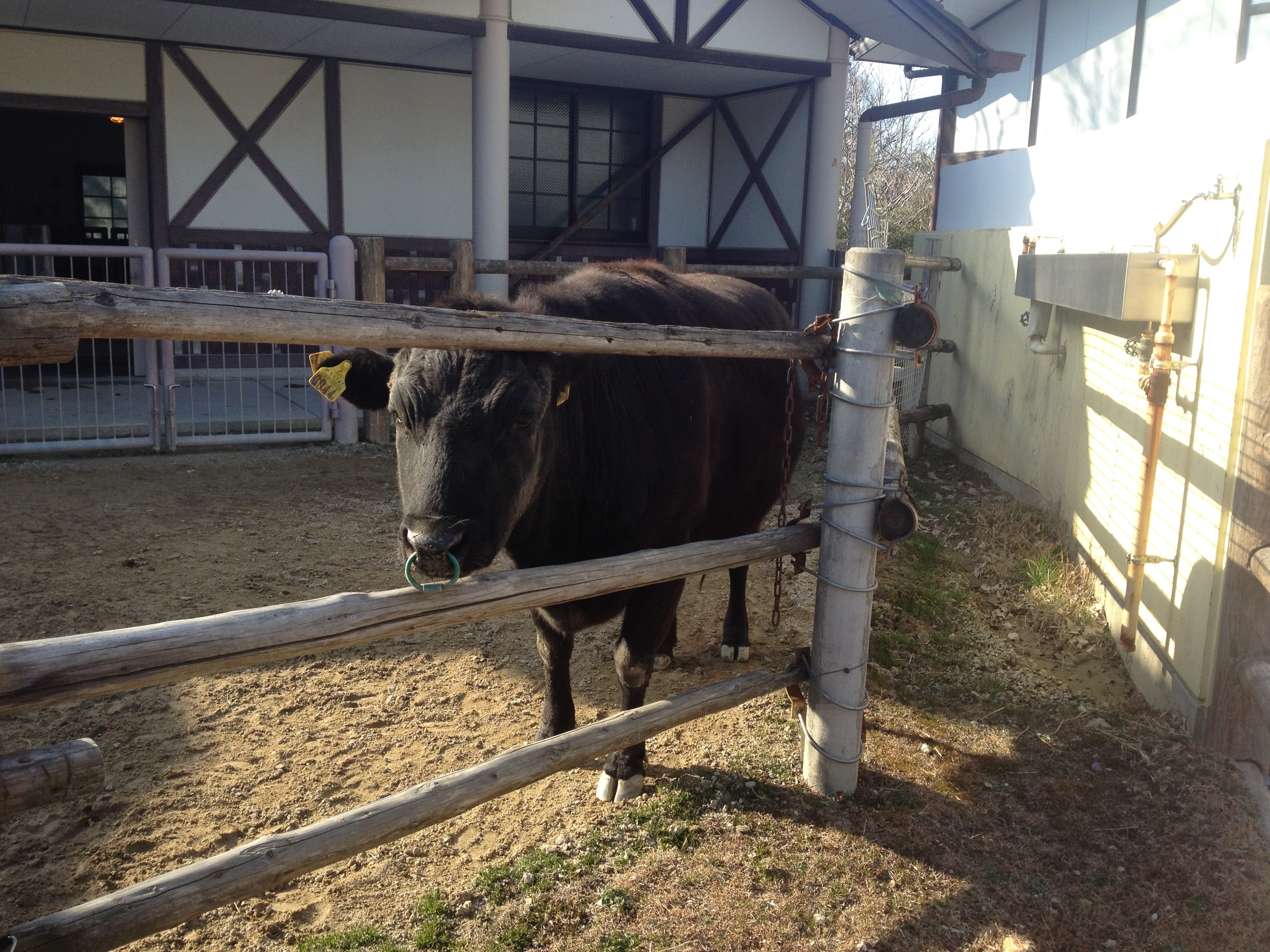
- In Higashiyama Zoo
- Conservation status: FAO (2007): critical-maintained
- Other names: Japanese: 口之島牛; Kuchinoshima ushi
- Country of origin: Japan
- Distribution: Kuchinoshima Island, Kagoshima Prefecture

Traits
- Weight: Male: 400 kg
- Height: Male: 110 cm; Female: 100 cm
- Coat: variable
- Horn status: horned in both sexes

The Kuchinoshima (Japanese: 口之島牛, Kuchinoshima ushi) is a critically-endangered Japanese breed of small feral cattle. It is found only on Kuchinoshima Island, in the Tokara Islands in Kagoshima Prefecture in southern Japan. It is one of six native Japanese cattle breeds, and one of two small populations that have never been cross-bred with Western cattle, the other being the Mishima breed from Mishima Island north-west of Hagi, in Yamaguchi Prefecture.

== History ==
Cattle were brought to Japan from China at the same time as the cultivation of rice, in about the second century AD, in the Yayoi period. Until about the time of the Meiji Restoration in 1868, they were used only as draught animals, in agriculture, forestry, mining and for transport, and as a source of fertiliser. Milk consumption was unknown, and – for cultural and religious reasons – meat was not eaten. Cattle were highly prized and valuable, too expensive for a poor farmer to buy.

Japan was effectively isolated from the rest of the world from 1635 until 1854; there was no possibility of intromission of foreign genes to the cattle population during this time. Between 1868, the year of the Meiji Restoration, and 1887, some 2600 foreign cattle were imported. At first there was little interest in cross-breeding these with native stock, but from about 1900 it became widespread. It ceased abruptly in 1910, when it was realised that, while the cross-breeds might be larger and have better dairy qualities, their working capacity and meat quality was lower. Among the various heterogeneous regional populations that resulted from this brief period of cross-breeding, four separate strains were characterised, and were recognised as breeds in 1944. These were the four wagyū breeds, the Japanese Black, the Japanese Brown and the Japanese Polled and the Japanese Shorthorn.

The Kuchinoshima population originates from cattle that escaped from farms in 1918. It is one of two small isolated groups of cattle which escaped the process of hybridisation; the other is the Mishima breed from Mishima Island north-west of Hagi, in Yamaguchi Prefecture. Together they represent the only surviving remnant of the native cattle population of Japan.

Since 1990, a few cattle have been removed from Kuchinoshima island, and small isolated populations have been bred at Kagoshima University and at Nagoya University; each has about 20 head, while some 55 remain on the island. In 2000 a mite-borne disease caused the death of about a third of the island population. In 2001 the total population was reported to be 99 head.

The Kuchinoshima was listed by the FAO as "critical-maintained" in 2007.
