= Kuchinoshima =

Island within the Ryukyu Islands

Native name: Japanese: 口之島
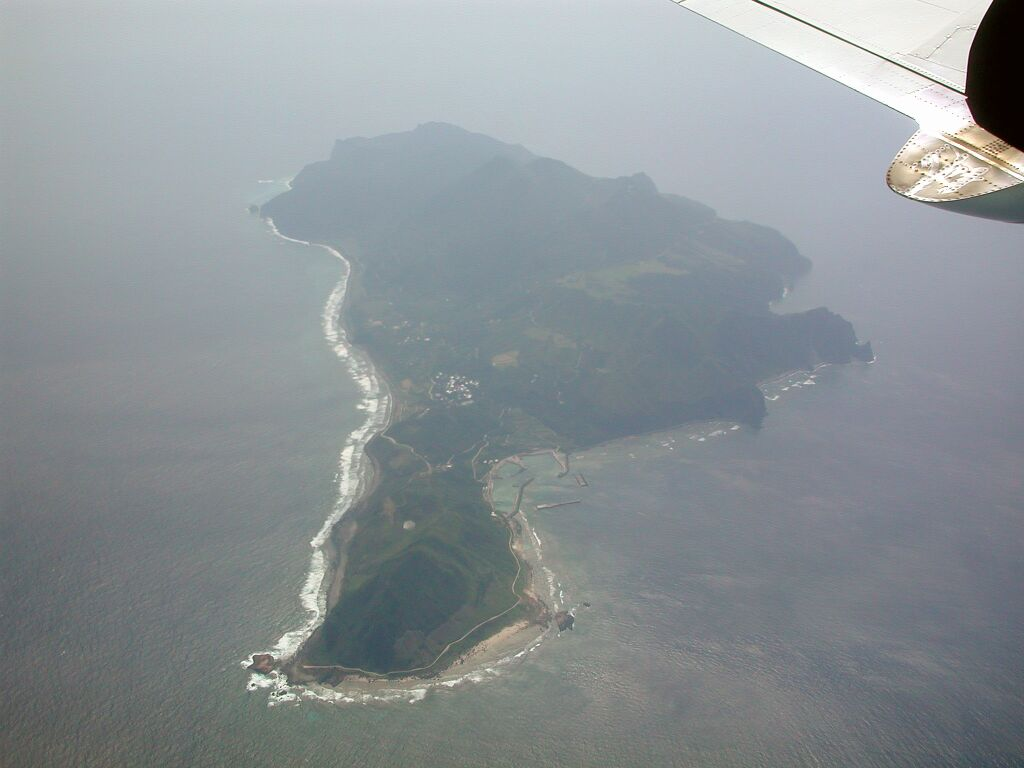
- Kuchinoshima in September 2001

Geography
- Location: East China Sea
- Coordinates: 29°58′0″N 129°55′0″E
- Archipelago: Tokara Islands
- Area: 13.33 km^{2} (5.15 sq mi)
- Coastline: 20.38 km (12.664 mi)
- Highest elevation: 628.5 m (2062 ft)
- Highest point: Maedake

Administration
- Japan
- Kagoshima Prefecture

Demographics
- Population: 140 (2004)
- Pop. density: 10.50/km^{2} (27.19/sq mi)
- Ethnic groups: Japanese

Kuchinoshima (口之島), literally "mouth island", is one of the Tokara Islands, belonging to Kagoshima Prefecture. The island, 13.33 km^{2} (5.15 sq mi) in area, and has a population of 140 persons. The island can only be reached by boat as it has no airport; there is regular ferry service to the city of Kagoshima on the mainland. Travel time is about 6 hours. The islanders are dependent mainly on agriculture, fishing and seasonal tourism. The island is home to the rare Kuchinoshima breed of Japanese native cattle.

== Geography ==
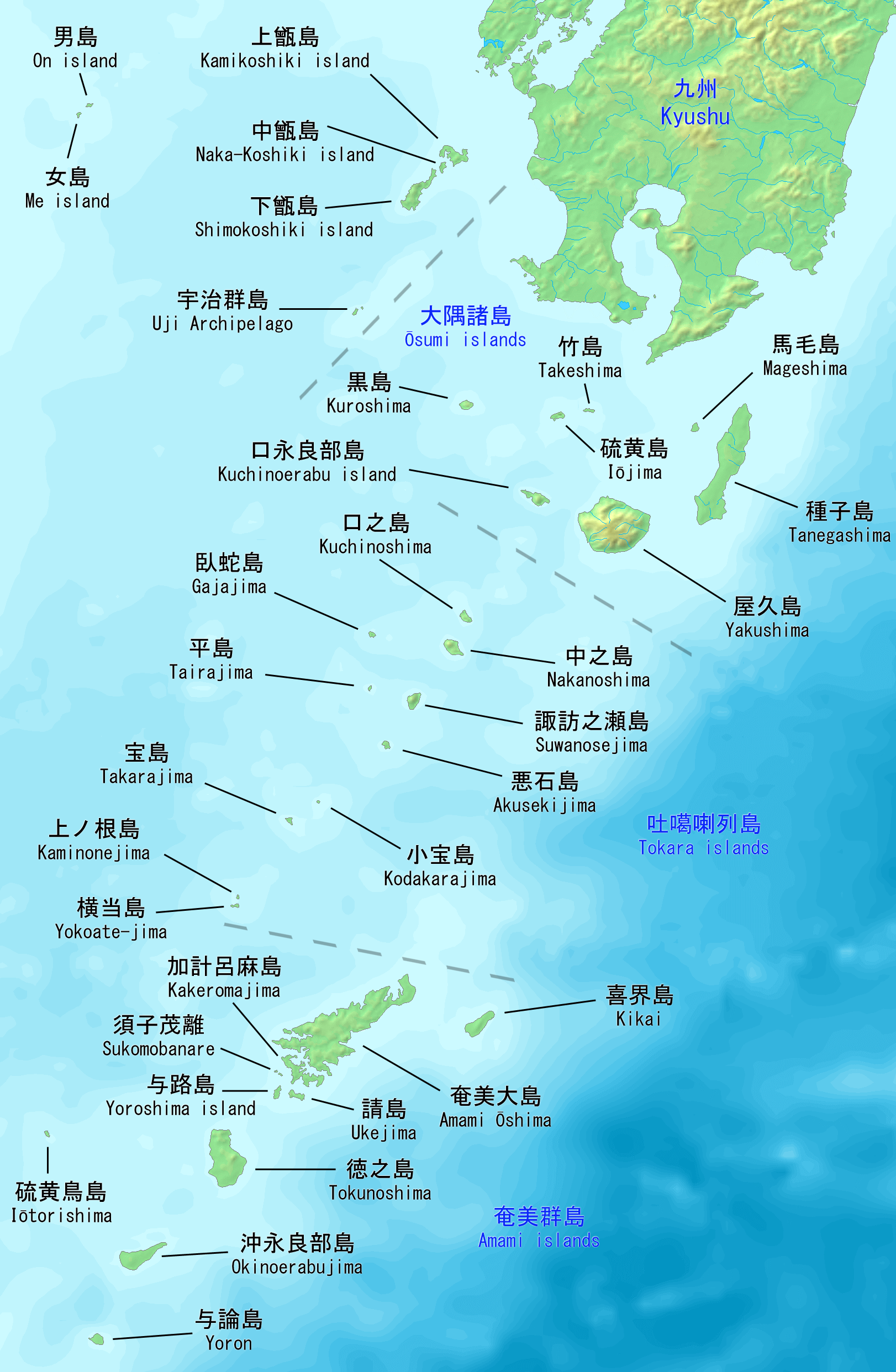
Map of Tokara islands with Kuchinoshima

Kuchinoshima is the northernmost inhabited island in the Tokara archipelago, and is located 10 kilometres (5.4 nmi) northeast from Nakanoshima. The highest elevation is Maedake (前岳) located in the eastern part of the island, with a height of 628.5 metres (2,062 ft) above sea level. Maedake, Moedake (燃岳) in the northern part of the island at 425 metres (1,394 ft), and Yokodake (横岳) in the western part of the island at 500 metres (1,640 ft), are the three volcanos which make up the island. Although there has been no eruption recorded in historical times, Moedake emits steam, and discoloration of the ocean in nearby waters in 2001 indicates ongoing volcanic activity. The local climate is classified as subtropical, with a rainy season from May through September.

== History ==
The island was once part of the Ryukyu Kingdom. During the Edo period, Kuchinoshima was part of Satsuma Domain and was administered as part of Kawanabe District. In 1896, the island was transferred to the administrative control of Ōshima District, Kagoshima, and from 1911 was administered as part of the village of Toshima, Kagoshima. From 1946 to 1952, the island was administered by the United States as part of the Provisional Government of Northern Ryukyu Islands.

The island is home to a small and endangered population of feral cattle, the Kuchinoshima (Kuchinoshima-Ushi) breed, which – with the Mishima breed – is one of two remaining breeds of Japanese native cattle. Kuchinoshima cattle is not the only feral cattle in Japan as there is a small group of feral cattle on Kazura Island next to Naru Island.

== See also ==
- List of islands in Japan
- List of volcanoes in Japan
