= Yakut =

Yakut most commonly refers to:

- Sakha Republic aka Yakutia, a republic in Russia
- Yakutsk, the capital of said republic
- Yakuts, the Turkic peoples of said Republic
- Yakut language, the Turkic language of said people

Yakut or Yakutian may also refer to:

- Yakut scripts, Scripts used to write the Yakut language
- Yakut (name)
- Yakut Autonomous Soviet Socialist Republic
- Yakutian Laika, a dog breed from the Sakha Republic
- Yakutian cattle, a breed from the Sakha Republic
- Yakutian horse, a breed from the Sakha Republic
- Cambrian Series 2, which is known as the Yakutian in Siberian nomenclature
- Central Yakutian Lowland

== See also ==
- Yaqut (disambiguation)
- Yakult, a Japanese yoghurt company
- Yakutsk (disambiguation)
