= Turano =

Turano may refer to:

== Places ==
- Turano (Valvestino), a village and subdivision (frazione) of the comune Valvestino, in Brescia, Italy
- Lago del Turano, a lake in the Province of Rieti, Lazio, Italy
- Turano Lodigiano, a comune in Lombardy, Italy
- Turano (river), a river which passes through Rieti, Italy where it was dammed to form the Lago del Turano

== People ==
- John Turano, American alt-right activist
- Renato Turano (1942-2021), Italian-American politician and businessman

== See also ==
- Turano-Mongolian cattle, a group of taurine cattle in Northern and Eastern Asia
