= Pietrascritta (funerary monument) =

- Pietrascritta (Italian)
- Location within Italy
- 42°10′24.6″N 12°58′10.7″E
- Type: Funerary monument
- Cultures: Sabine, Roman
- Location: Paganico Sabino, Rieti, Italy
- Region: Rieti

History
- Built: 1st century BC

Site notes
- Public access: No
- Website: https://www.paganicosabino.org/la-pietrascritta/

Pietrascritta ("written stone", also known as funerary monument of Muttini) is a Roman funerary monument situated near the Turanese provincial road outside of the village of Paganico Sabino. Constructed for the Muttini family sometime during the late 1st century BCE, the structure has acted as an important local landmark within the Paganico Sabino area.

== Location and setting ==
The monument is located approximately 3.3 kilometres to the right of the main road in Paganico Sabino. It has a prominent position on a rocky outcrop overlooking the Turano Valley. Researchers have interpreted the monument's notable placement as deliberate for maximum visibility throughout the valley. Additionally the inscription on the South-Western face of the monument overlooks the Turano River, making it clearly visible to anyone passing through the valley.

== Construction ==
It is thought that the monument is a large worked block of local limestone. Evidence of careful stone cutting is visible on several sides of the monument despite some weathering and damage occurring over time. The worked surfaces indicate the intentional shaping of the rock rather than it being left in its natural state. The surviving stone rests on a carefully constructed square base.

=== Dimensions ===
The primary block measures approximately: Length 3.45m, Width 4.03m, Height 3.8m. The lower square plinth it sits on measures: Height 0.7m, Length 3.8m, width 2m.

=== Upper cavity ===
There is also a circular cavity in the centre of the top of the monument which measures: diameter 50 cm, depth: 50 cm.

It is believed that this cavity was produced deliberately rather than naturally, possibly as a decorative element or a structural component of the monument. Although researchers initially observed the cavity to be filled with earth and debris, the deliberate excavation is indicated by it being lined with worked stone. The interior has a roughly truncated-conical shape, evidence of intentional finishing by stone-cutting tools is also visible on the interior walls.

=== Decorative elements ===
Evidence indicates that the monument originally had several decorative features which have since been lost.

These are thought to be:

- Moulded cornices;
- A small roofed superstructure;
- Architectural ornamentation;
- Possible sculptural elements fixed to the socket on the upper surface of the monument.

== Inscription ==
A dedicatory epigraph is carved into the south western facade of the monument that faces away from the modern road towards the Turano river. The peculiarity of the monuments orientation suggests that it would have originally faced a major Roman road possibly connecting the settlements of Trebula Mutuesca (Monteleone Sabino) to Carseolis (Carsoli). The inscription names three members of the Muttini family, a freeborn father, a mother of ambiguous social rank and a son who is the only one with a cognomen, denoting him as a full Roman citizen and a member of the Sergia tribe. The purpose of the monument would have therefore likely been to project the Muttini families social status and the honour bestowed upon the son. The prominence of this inscription also suggests that the monument was erected sometime after the Social War (90 BCE).

P(UBLIUS) MUTTINUS P(UBLII) F(ILIUS) PATER

CLODIA MATER

P(UBLIUS) MUTTINUS (PUBLII) F(ILIUS) SER(GIA TRIBU) SABIN(US)

== See also ==
- Necropolis at Fontanelle
- Roman funerary practices
- San Giovanni in Fistola
