= Necropolis at Fontanelle =

- Necropoli romana della Fontanelle (Italian)
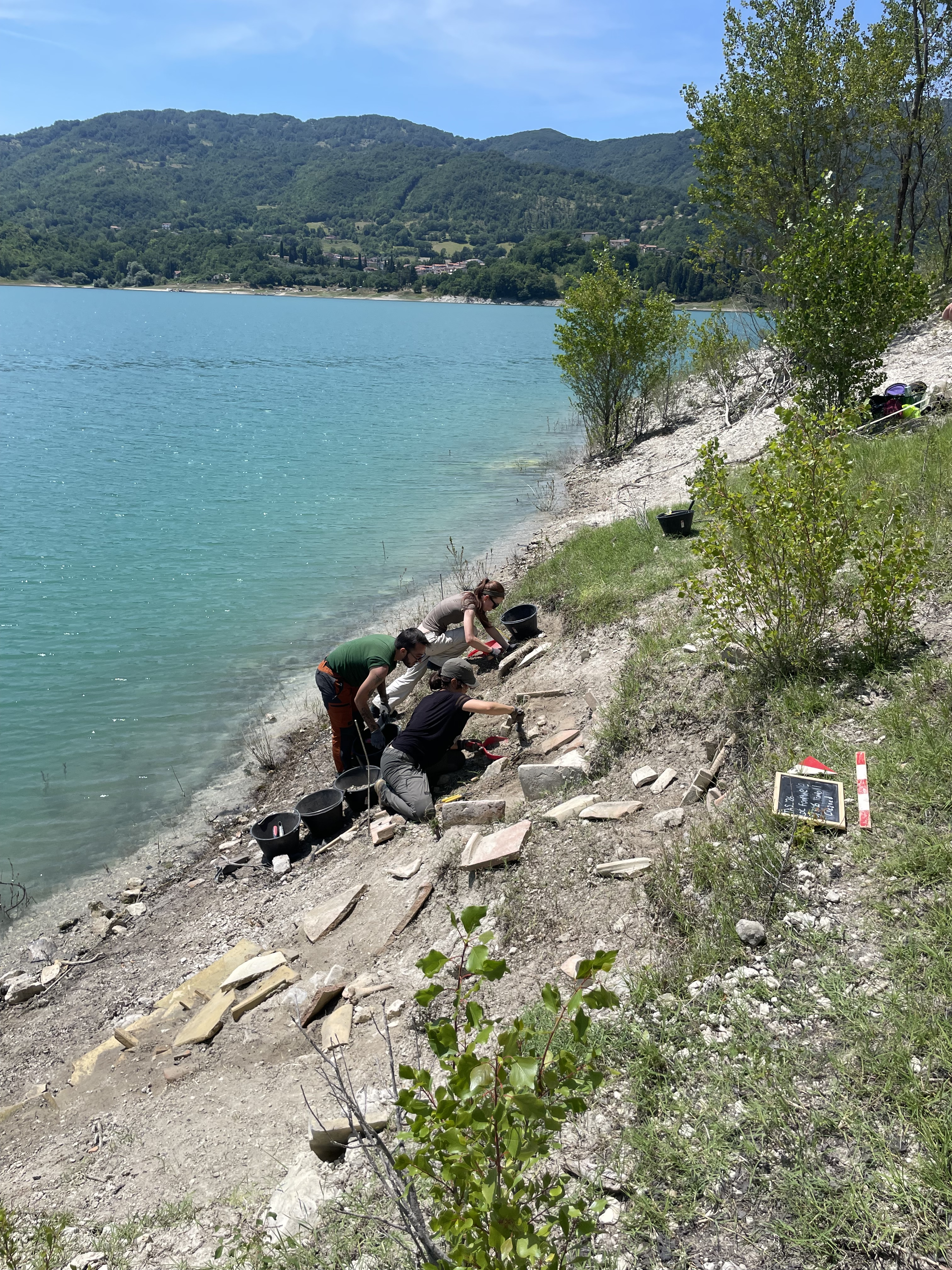
- Excavation of the necropolis at Fontanelle
- Type: Necropolis
- Cultures: Roman
- Location: Rieti, Lazio, Italy

History
- Built: Third Century

Site notes
- Management: Superintendence of Archaeology, Fine Arts and Landscape for the Rome metropolitan area and the Province of Rieti
- Public access: No

The Necropolis at Fontanelle is a burial site located in Castel Di Tora, in the Lazio region of Italy. It dates to the middle Imperial Roman period. Since 2021, at least 20 tombs have been discovered, alongside a small number of grave goods.

== Location ==
The site is located in Castel Di Tora, on the shoreline of Lake Turano, an artificial lake created in the 1930s through the construction of the Turano dam. The necropolis was located along an important Roman road, connecting it to the wider network of the Lazio region. This area was a part of the ager Trebulanus and was in use between the middle and late third century.

== Discovery ==
Archaeological interest in the site began in 2021, following landslides which led to residents' reports of tiles and bones. Through a week of excavation, at least twelve tombs were initially discovered and three were fully excavated under the direction of the Superintendence of Archaeology, Fine Arts and Landscape for the Rome metropolitan area and the Province of Rieti (SABAP-MET-RM).

== Excavation ==
The first excavation was done in 2021, revealing 12 tombs and cementing the archaeological significance of the site. In 2025 and 2026, a collaboration between students at Durham University and Tor Vergata University was undertaken, revealing a further eight tombs. This was done alongside the Turano Archaeo Survey Project, which aims to improve cultural heritage of the area.

At least 15-20 burial tombs have been found, of the Tomba alla cappuccina, which uses roof tiles to cover the body. This type of burial is usually associated with a low social background and does not typically have rich funeral equipment. In several tombs at the site, the tiles are marked with circular motifs.

Paleoanthropological analysis has revealed mainly adult male and female remains, as well as adolescents. Diet, mobility and origin are also being investigated through isotopic and molecular studies as a part of the Turano Archaeo Survey Project.

The modest funerary objects discovered include iron nails related to footwear, ceramic containers, a lantern, and a coin from the third century. Analysis of the human remains indicate that this population was poor, especially relating to their diets.

== See also ==
- Castel Di Tora
- Pietrascritta (funerary monument)
- San Giovanni in Fistola
