= Simmental cattle =

Swiss breed of cattle

Original Simmentaler
- Simmental cow on alpine pasture at Oeschinensee, Switzerland
- Other names: Simmentaler Fleckvieh
- Country of origin: Simmental, Switzerland
- Distribution: worldwide in numerous strains
- Standard: <12.5% Holstein Friesian ancestry
- Use: dual-purpose, beef/dairy

Traits
- Weight: Male: 1100–1300 kg (2400–2900 lb); Female: 600–800 kg (1300–1800 lb)
- Height: Male: 150–158 cm (59–62 in); Female: 138–142 cm (54–56 in)
- Coat: red on white
- Horn status: horned

Notes
- different from Swiss Fleckvieh cattle
- Cattle; Bos (primigenius) taurus

The Simmental or Swiss Fleckvieh is a Swiss breed of dual-purpose cattle. It is named after the Simmental – the valley of the Simme river – in the Bernese Oberland, in the canton of Bern in Switzerland. The breed is typically reddish in colour with white markings, and is raised for both milk and meat.

== History ==
=== European origin ===
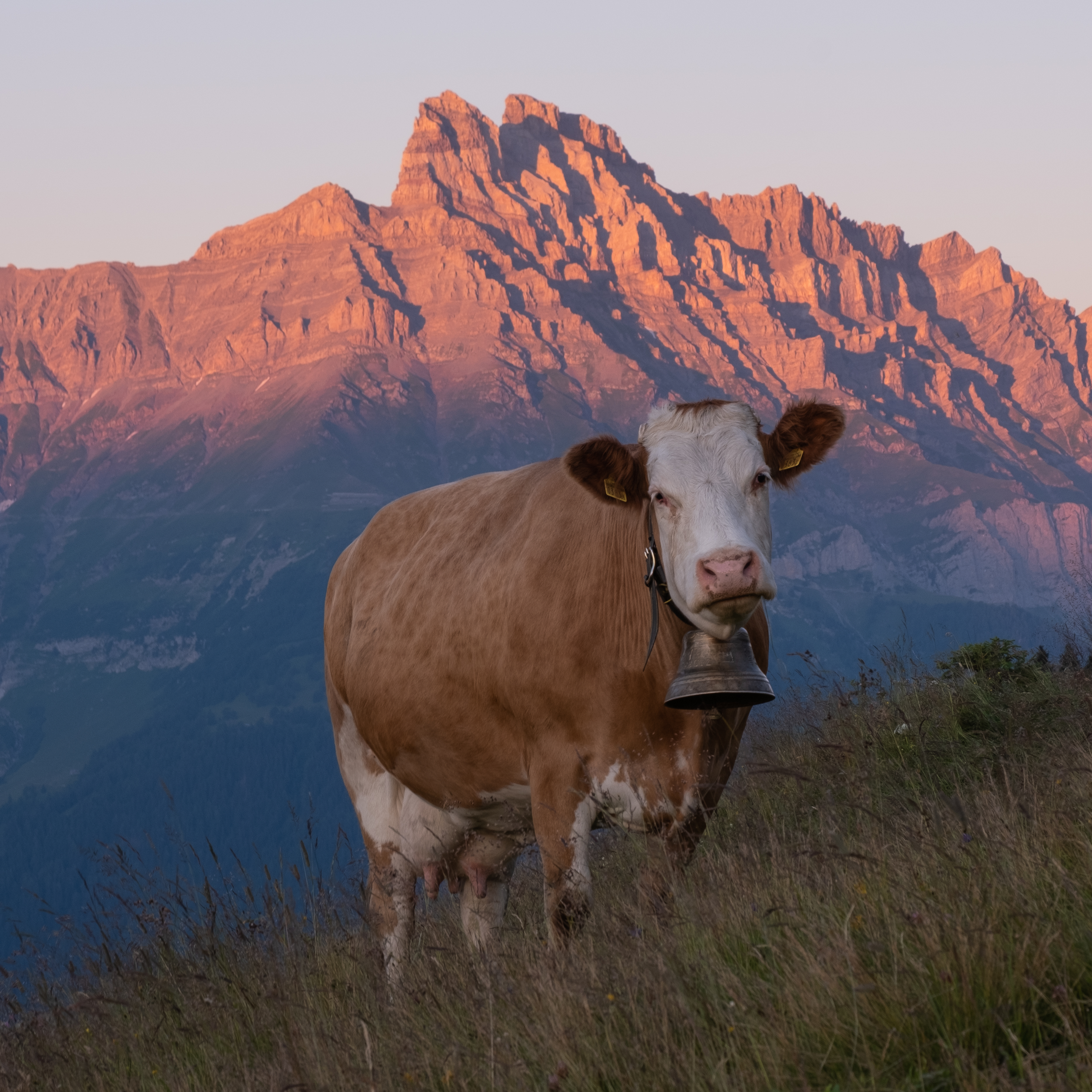
A Simmental in front of the Dent de Morcles mountain in the Bernese Alps, Switzerland

Among the older and most widely distributed of all breeds of cattle in the world, and recorded since the Middle Ages, the Simmental breed has contributed to the creation of several other famous European breeds, including the Montbéliarde (France), the Pezzata Rossa d'Oropa (Italy), and the Fleckvieh (Germany and Austria). It originates from the Simmental, the valley of the Simme river.

=== Africa ===
Namibia (1893) and South Africa (1905) were the first countries outside Europe where the breed was successfully established. There the breed is known as Simmentaler and is mainly used for beef cattle production under suckler cow systems. The Simmentaler breeders' society is, as far as registered animals are concerned, by far the largest of the 17 European and British breeds. The main reasons for its popularity are (i) it can be used with great success in crossbreeding for breeding of both cows with much milk and heavy weaners/oxen, (ii) its superb weight growth rate in feedlots - pure or crossed, and (iii) a strict visual inspection is compulsory for registration in the Herdbook.

=== Soviet Union ===
The first Simmentals arrived in Russia by 1850, coming from German and Swiss varieties. The Soviet Union (1922–1991)'s agricultural policies favored the Simmental (Симментальская корова, Simmental'skaya) and it came to have the largest Simmental population of any country at their height. Russian Simmental accounted for around one-quarter of all cattle in the USSR. Estimates range from a population of 12 to 17 million Simmental cattle in 1980. Various crossbreeds were made, including:

- Steppe Simmental (Russian cattle × Simmental bulls)
- Ukrainian Simmental (Grey steppe cattle × Simmental bulls)
- Volga Simmental (Central Russian Kalmyk and Kazakh cattle × Simmental bulls)
- Ural Simmental (Siberian and Kazakh cattle × Simmental)
- Siberian Simmental (Siberian and Buryat cattle × Simmental)
- Far Eastern Simmental (Transbaikal and Yakutian cattle × Simmental)

According to FAO data, the number of Simmentals plummeted with the fall of the Soviet Union in 1991. Their estimates list around 13 million in 1990; 3 million in 2003; and a mere 86,000 in 2023. Agriculture in Russia underwent massive changes in general with the end of Soviet agriculture policies. The amount of cattle kept in Russia declined overall, and there was a shift toward favoring specialized breeds (e.g. Holsteins for milk, Angus for beef) rather than the flexible and multi-purpose Simmental which could do both as well as work.

== Different names ==
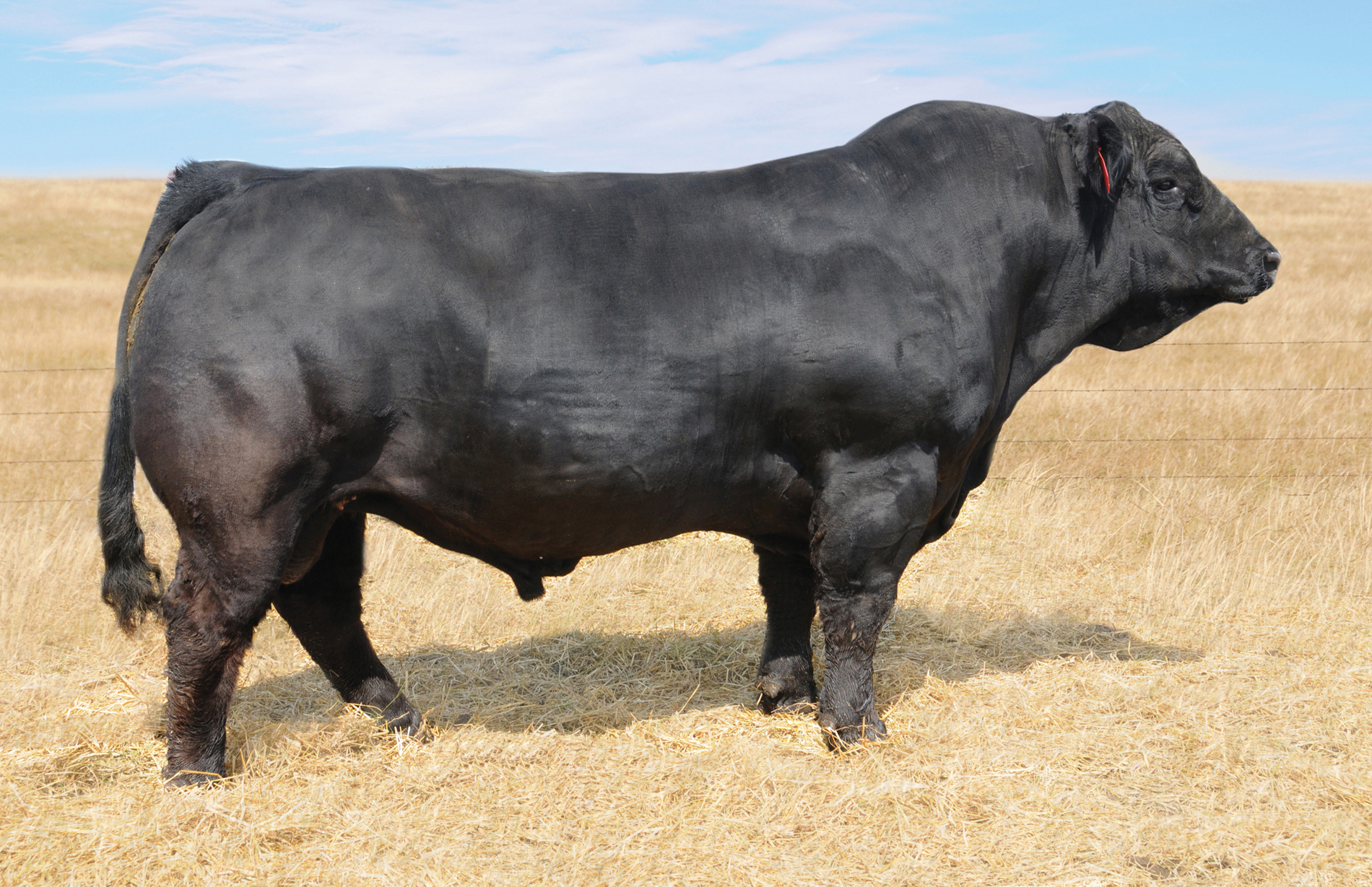
Purebred "Black Simmental" bull in North America

"Fleckvieh" is a German word that translates literally to "Spotted cow" or "Spotted cattle". The breed is known under various names:

- Fleckvieh Simmental: Argentina
- Simmental: Australia, Brazil, Bulgaria, Canada, Colombia, Denmark, France (early 1990s name change from Pie Rouge), Ireland, Mexico, New Zealand, Poland, Sweden, Switzerland (SI-division), United Kingdom, USA, Zambia and Zimbabwe
- Fleckvieh: Austria, Germany, Netherlands, Spain, Switzerland (SF-division) and Uruguay
- Simmentaler: South Africa and Namibia
- Local names based on the breed-name used in the official breed association names which boil down to "spotted cattle": Bosnia-Herzegovina, Croatia, Czech Republic, Hungary, Romania, Serbia, Slovakia, Slovenia. Most of these countries use Simmental as a translation of their local name.

Pezzata Rossa: Italy. Montbéliarde: A French dairy breed. Member of European Simmental Federation but not of the World Simmental-Fleckvieh Federation.

== Characteristics ==
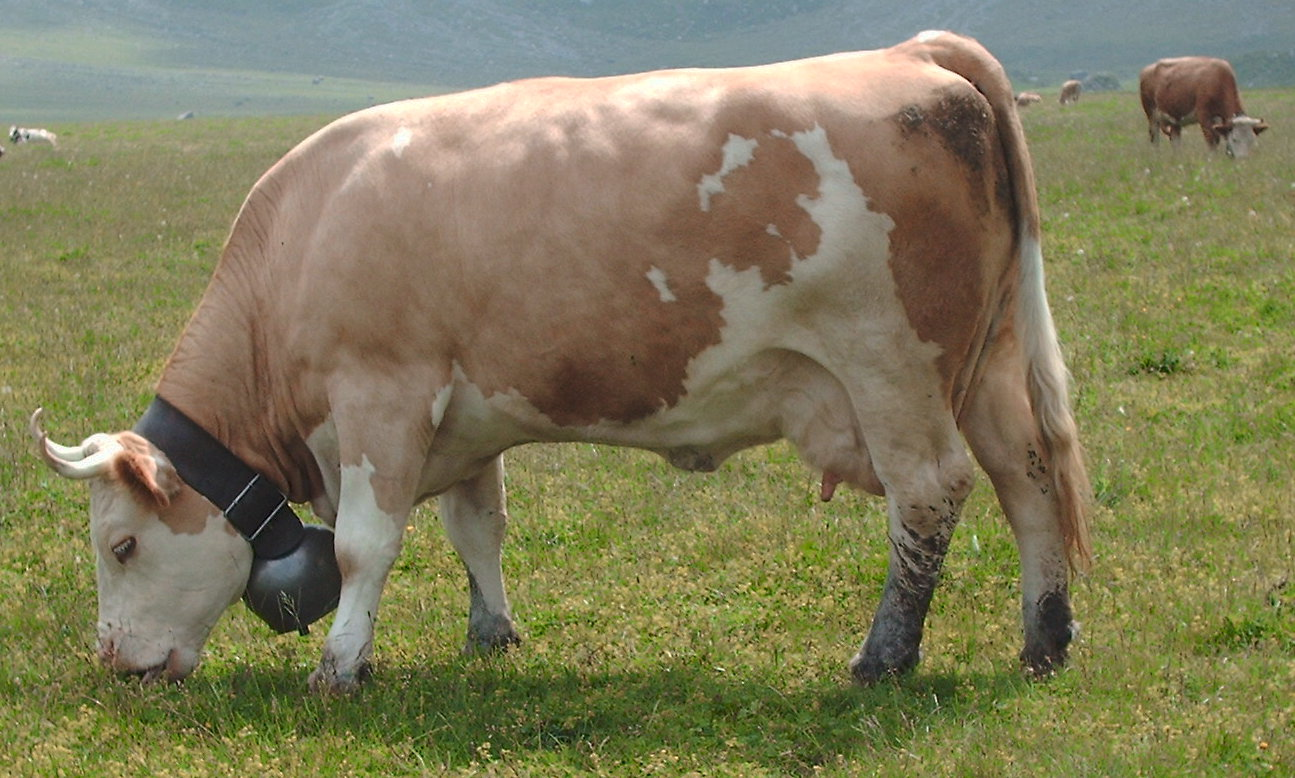
Traditional Simmental cow grazing on an alpine pasture (Engstligenalp)

=== Traditional ===
The Simmental has historically been used for dairy and beef, and as draught animals. They are particularly renowned for the rapid growth of their young, if given sufficient feed. Simmentals provide more combined weaning gain (growth) and milk yield than any other breed. They also have lower frequency of dental lesions compared to other breeds.

=== Africa ===
In contrast to countries which allow black and solid brown coloured Simmental in the herdbook, Namibia and South Africa only register Simmentaler with the typical colour i.e. from dark red or brown to yellow spread over the body in any pattern with at least some white on the forehead and the lower-leg area, solid black or solid red animals are non-existent because they are not registered.

== Types ==
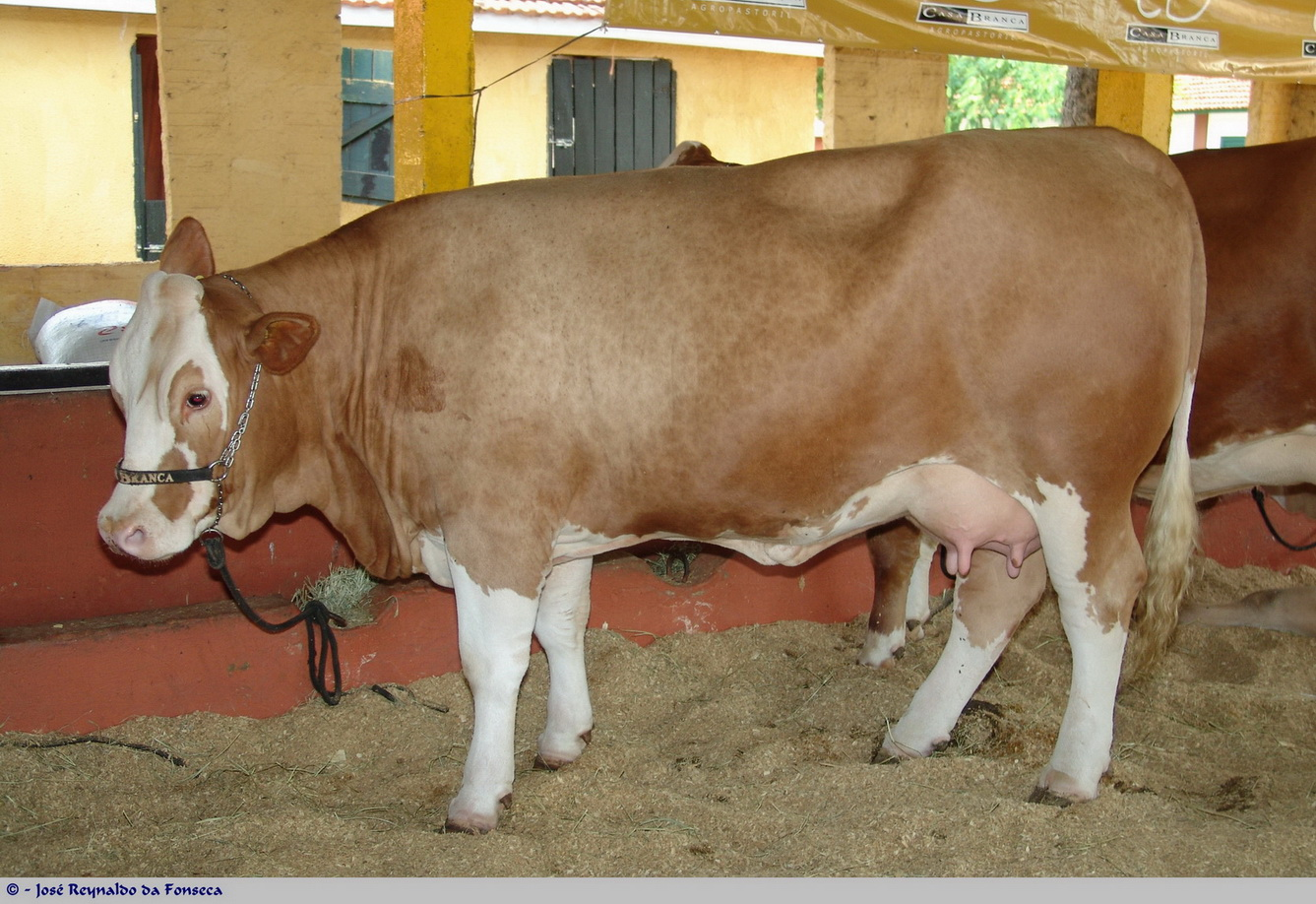
A cow in Brazil, 2007

No other breed in the world has such a large within-breed-type variation as Simmental-Fleckvieh which is classifiable in the following types:

- Dairy type like specialised dairy breeds (referring to Swiss Fleckvieh (code SF) with over 55% Red Holstein blood and the French Montebeliard breed);
- Dual purpose but major emphasis on milk;
- Truly dual-purpose (all cows are milked and bulls excel in weight gain);
- Moderate beef type (suckler, extensive ranching with moderate to small frame size);
- Extreme beef type (suckler, comparable to specialised beef breeds like for example Charolais, large frame size).

The traditional colouration of the Simmental has been described variously as "red and white spotted" or "gold and white", although there is no specific standard colouration, and the dominant shade varies from a pale yellow-gold all the way to very dark red (the latter being particularly popular in the United States). The face is normally white, and this characteristic is usually passed to crossbred calves. The white face is genetically distinct from the white head of the Hereford. Black Simmental and Red Simmental are the two most common non-spotted coat variations for Simmental.

== Gallery ==
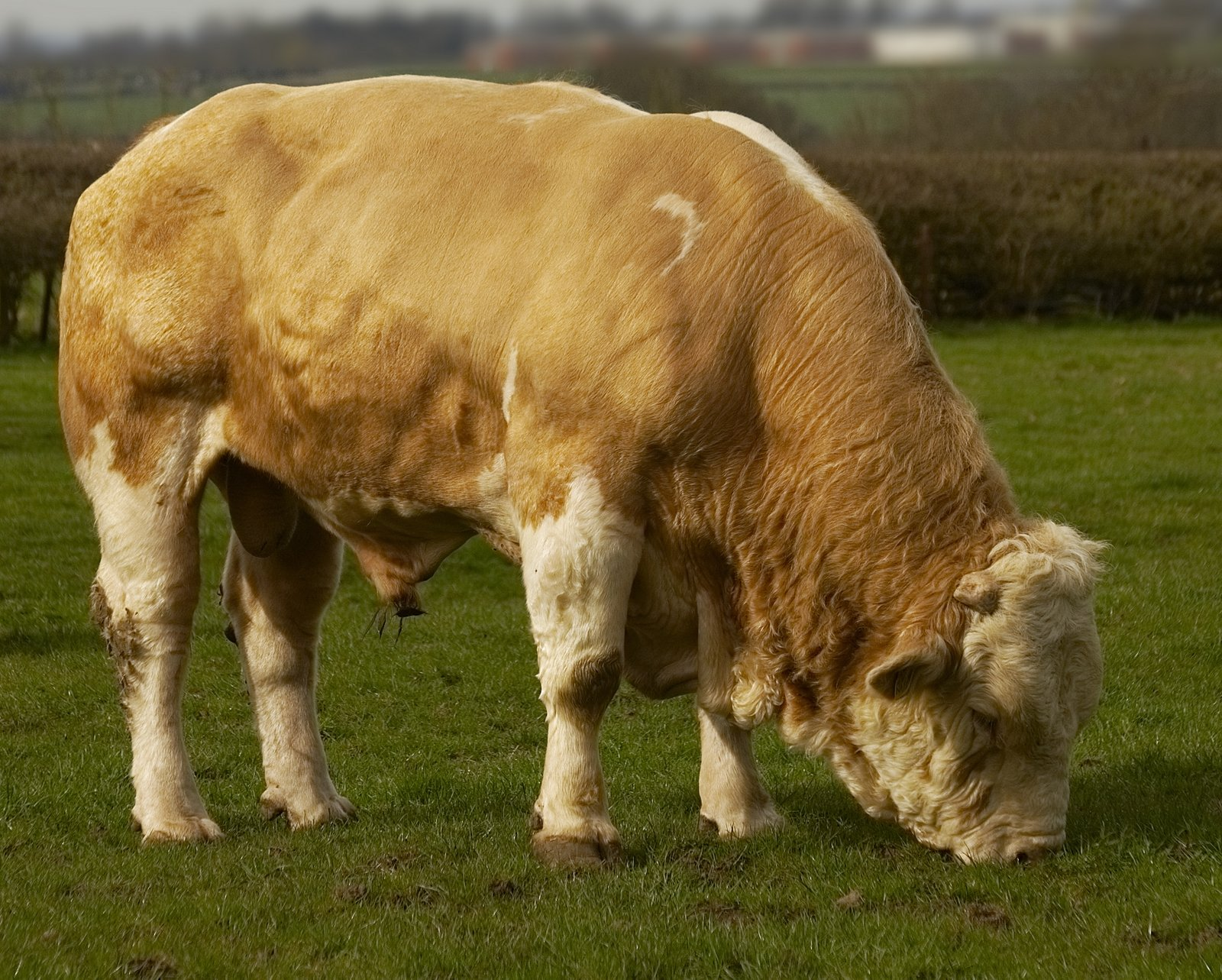
A bull grazing, 2010

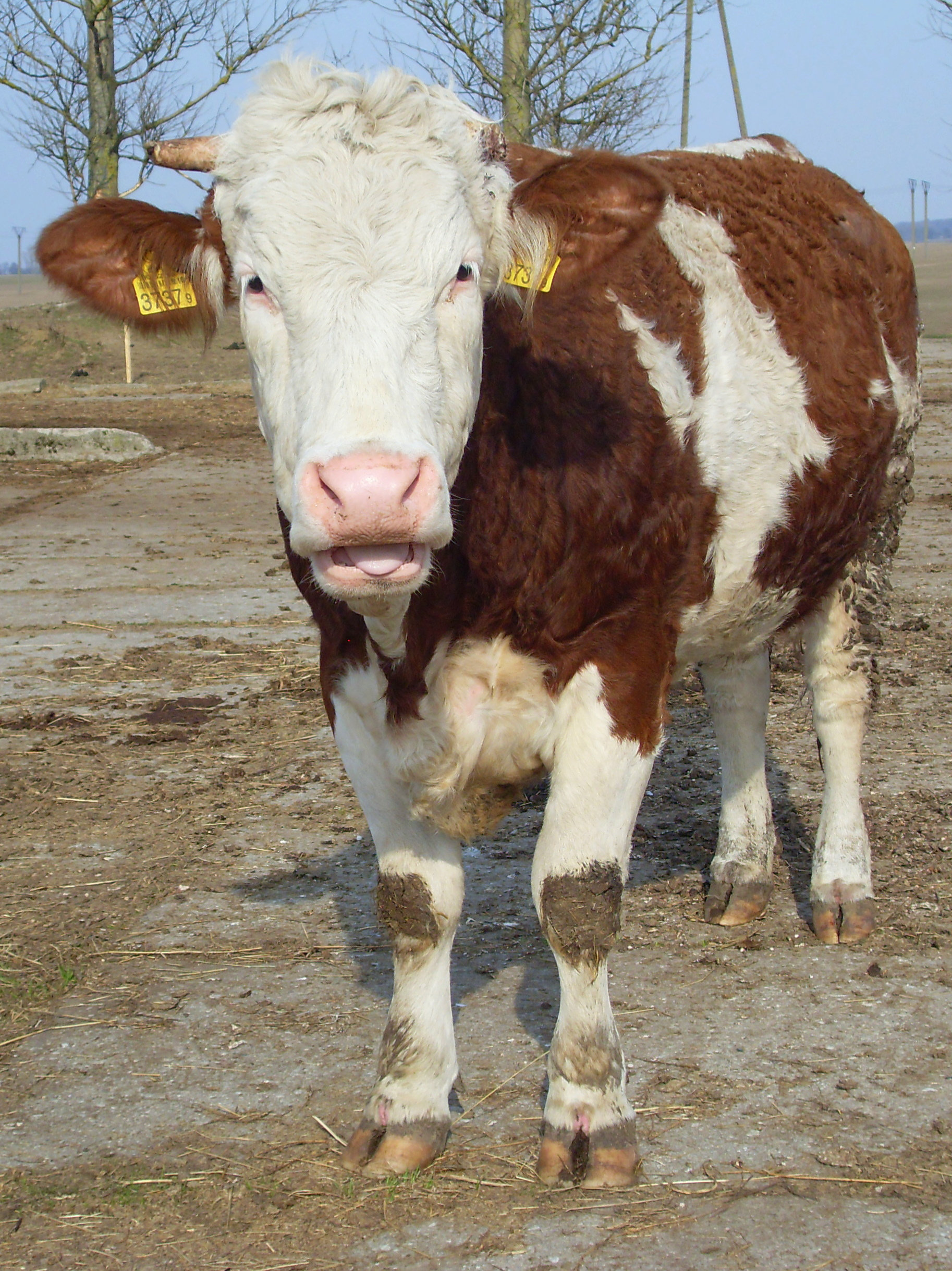
In Poland, 2011

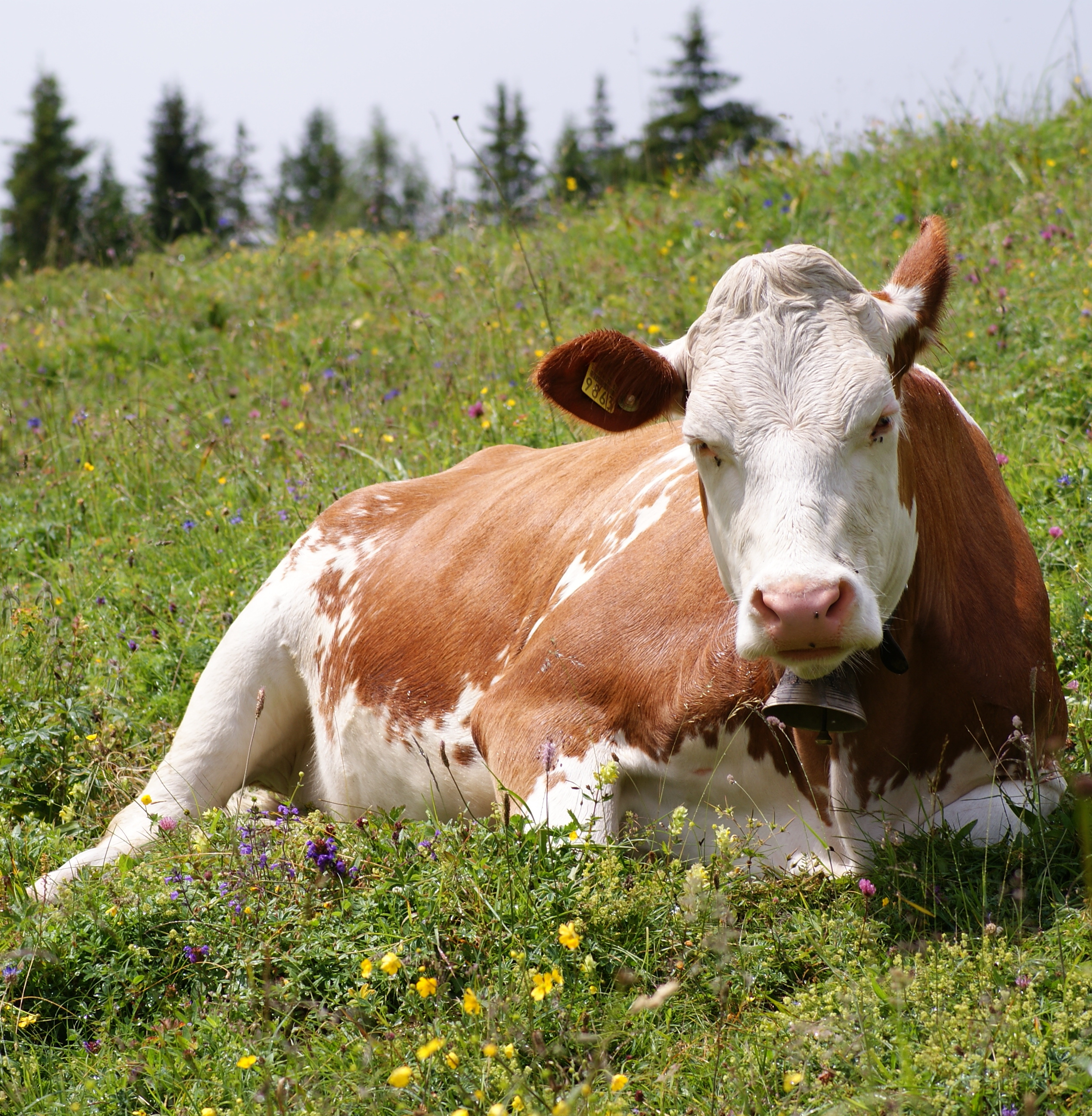
Lying down near Oeschinen Lake, 2009

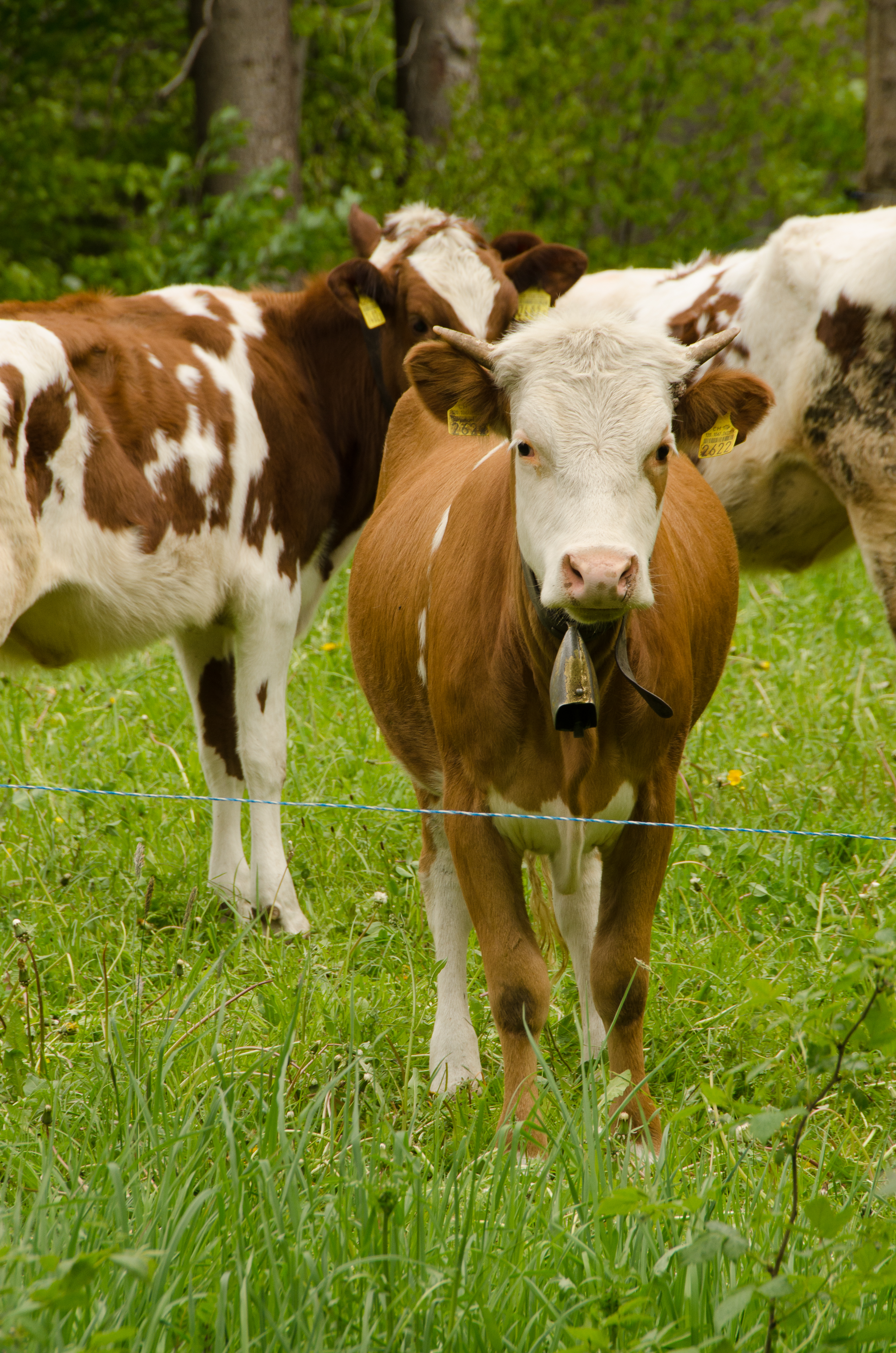
A calf near Wilderswil, Switzerland, 2014

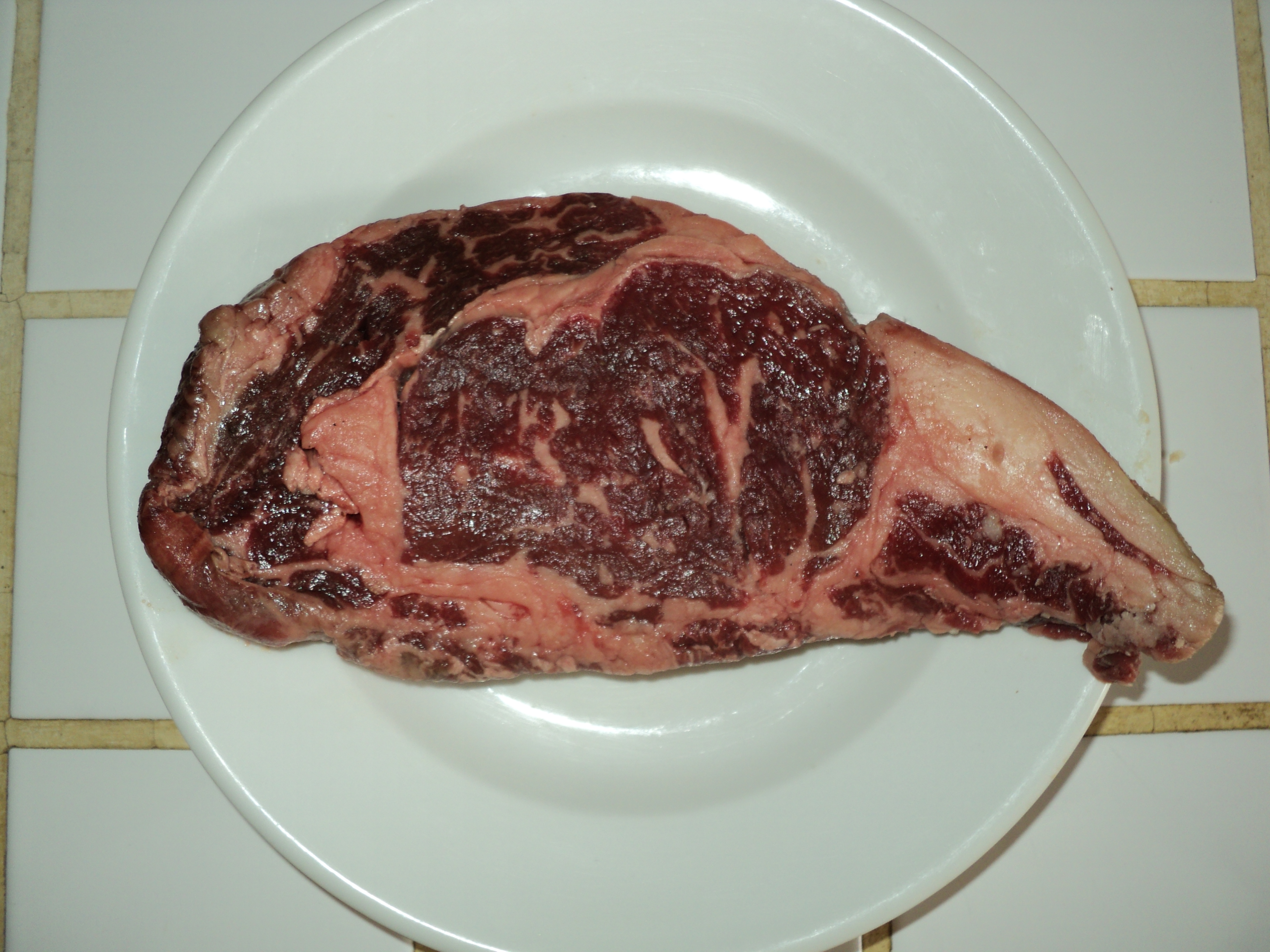
A Simmental entrecôte steak

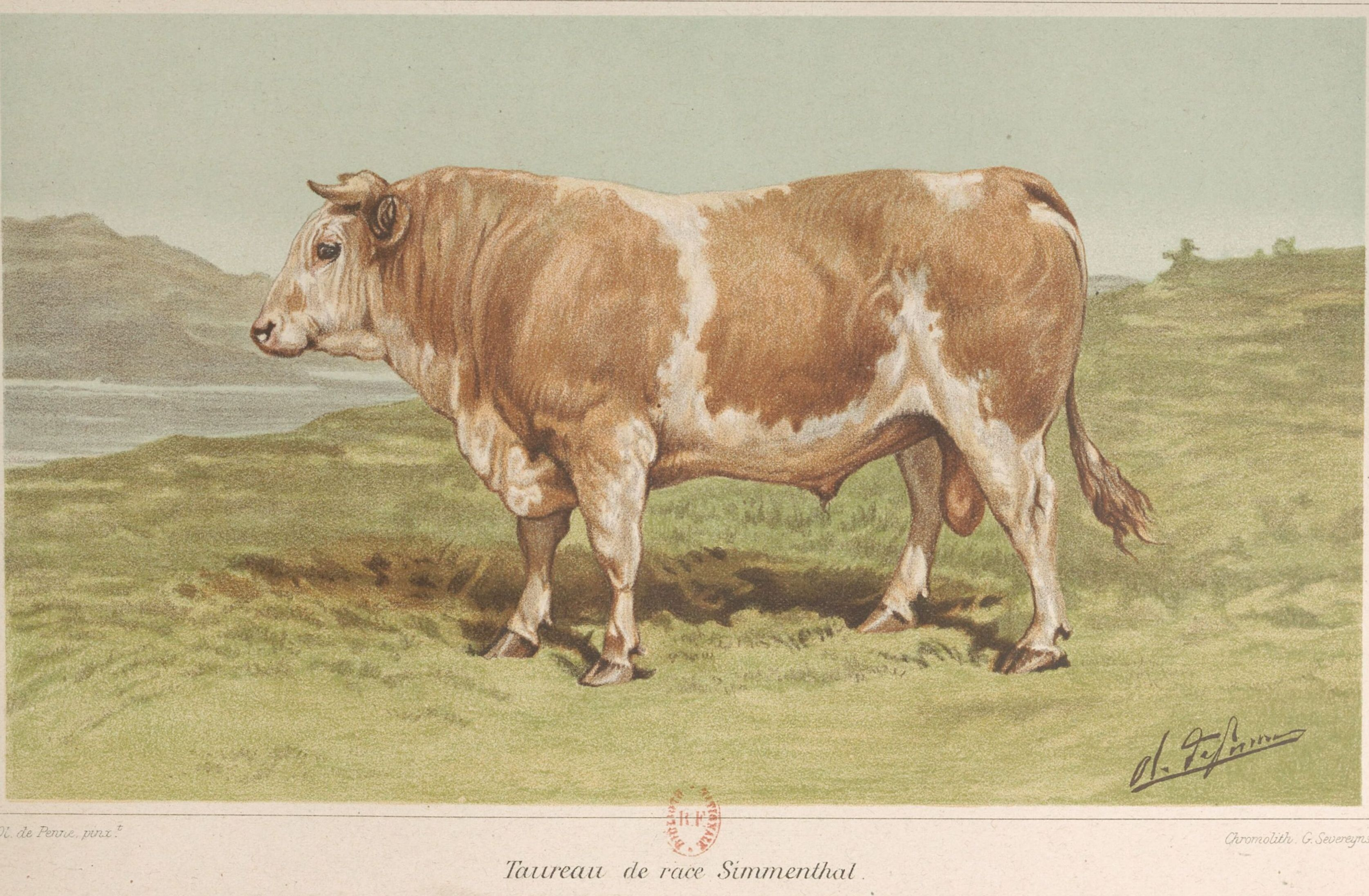
Simmental Illustration, published 1911

== See also ==
- French Simmental
- Fleckvieh cattle
