= Al-Atharibi =

Abū al-Fawāris Ḥamdān ibn ʿAbd al-Raḥīm al-Athāribī (c. 1067 – 1147) was a Syrian Muslim physician, diplomat, administrator, poet and historian who wrote a wrote a History of the Franks, an early account of the Crusades from a Muslim perspective.

== Life ==
Most of what is known about al-Atharibi's life is drawn from Ibn al-Adim's Bughyat al-talab fi ta'rikh Halab, a biographical dictionary of Aleppo. It includes excerpts of his poetry. He was born around 1067 in the village of Ma'arat Atarib. The family later relocated to the larger village of Atarib. After Atharib came under Frankish (i.e., Crusader) rule around 1111, al-Atharibi administered some lands on behalf of the conquerors before having his wealth confiscated.

Al-Atharibi moved to Aleppo probably in the late 1110s. He studied adab under Ibn Abi Jarada. He also studied astronomy, grammar, history, mathematics and medicine. Yaqut describes him as a physician. He was a fixture of the cultural scene in Aleppo, hosting literary salons and drinking parties.

Al-Atharibi served the local rulers of Aleppo as a diplomat. Ibn al-Adim mentions diplomatic missions to the Franks, to Sultan al-Amir of Egypt, to the atabeg Toghtekin of Damascus and to Baghdad, without providing dates for the first three, although they are probably listed in chronological order. According to Ibn Muyassar, al-Atharibi was in Egypt on behalf of Aqsunqur al-Bursuqi in 1126. Ibn al-Adim relates the story that the sultan suspected him of being a member of the sect of the Assassins before al-Atharibi reassured him with some poetry. He was in Baghdad in 1145 on behalf of Imad al-Din Zengi.

At some point, al-Atharibi was administering the diwan of Ma'arrat al-Nu'man, although whether for the Franks or the ruler of Aleppo is unclear. In 1127, while visiting his native village, he learned that the Alan, the Frankish lord of Atharib, was ill and successfully cured him. The Frank rewarded him with the deserted village of Ma'arbuniyya (near Idlib), which he put under cultivation and where he built a residence. (This has sometimes been seen as a feudal relationship.) Although al-Atharibi continued to work for the Muslim rulers of Aleppo, his primary residence for the rest of his life was Ma'arbuniyya. All the places he lived outside of Aleppo were in the al-Jazr region between Aleppo and Antioch.

Al-Atharibi died in 1147 in his eighties.

== Works ==
Al-Atharibi belonged to the Banu Tamim and claimed descent from their pre-Islamic hero, Hajib ibn Zurara. He is said to have written an account of the ayyam (days) of the Tamim. He put together a collection of his own poetry (diwan), of which Ibn al-Adim consulted the autograph manuscript. He quotes a poem in which al-Atharibi responds to criticism he received from Ibn Abi Jarada for living voluntarily under Frankish rule:

You blame me for cultivating my passion in a village

whose people are not noble.

You ask: "Why would you do that?" I reply to you:

"Fate planned this for me, and the plans of fate will be accomplished.

My trustworthy friends are stingy, and boon companions have deserted me;

the sincere care not, and the Muslim sovereign is a tyrant.

So, here I live. After all, is the musk not found

in buckskin; does the pearl not dwell in shells?

Al-Atharibi's most famous work is a lost history described by Ibn al-Adim as "the history of Aleppo from the year 1096 which includes accounts of the Franks and their deeds and their going forth to Syria in the aforementioned year and what happened afterward". The title Ibn al-Adim gives the work has been variously read as al-Muwaffaq (The Suitable) or al-Mufawwaf (The Thin). Ibn Muyassar, however, mentions a work with the title Sirat al-ifranj al-kharijin ila bilad al-islam fi hadhihi'l sinin (A History of the Franks Who Went Out to the Lands of Islam in These Years). These are generally taken to be the same work, although Paul Cobb argues that the former is merely a chronicle of Aleppo while the latter was a more literary history of the Franks specifically. When Ibn al-Adim cites a story from the Akhbar al-Ifranj (Accounts of the Franks), it is the latter work rather than former that he is quoting. Al-Azimi may have used the Akhbar al-Ifranj as a source.

Al-Atharibi's History of the Franks would appear to be the only contemporary "Muslim history of the Crusades and the Latin presence in the Levant" ever written. Paul Cobb calls it "a trope in writing about Hamdan that modern authors must mourn the loss of this work" and concludes after scrutinizting the fragments that survive that "it is still appropriate to mourn the loss of his works."
