= Turano-Mongolian cattle =

Taurine cattle in Northern and Eastern Asia

Turano-Mongolian cattle are a group of taurine cattle that are found in Northern and Eastern Asia. They are morphologically and genetically distinct from the Near-Eastern group of taurine cattle, from which European cattle are descended; they may have been domesticated independently.

== Differences from Near Eastern/European cattle ==
Turano-Mongolian cattle are morphologically distinct from the European taurine cattle especially in the shape of their skull and their horns. The skull is wedge-shaped and has a narrow crown and a depression on the frontal bone. The horns grow upwards instead of forwards.

Genetically the difference can be seen in the mtDNA haplogroups. Of the five mtDNA haplogroups (T, T1, T2, T3, T4) found in existing taurine cattle breeds, T2, T3 and T4 appear in the Turano-Mongolian group. T4 is unique to the breeds of this group. T is found in both Near Eastern and European breeds, while T1 appears only in African and (at lower frequencies) in Near Eastern breeds. T2 is found in all three Eurasian regions, though only at low frequencies in European and Turano-Mongolian breeds. Finally T3 is common to all Eurasian regions, but found only in very low numbers in Africa.

== Resistance to harsh climates and freezing temperatures ==
Many breeds of Turano-Mongolian cattle show a great hardiness and tolerance towards freezing temperatures as a result of adaption to harsh Asian climates. Especially the breeds of the Asian steppe and the Tibetan Plateau are able to withstand temperature fluctuations from –50 °C to 35 °C (–60 °F to 95 °F). A singular adaption is shown by the Yakutian cattle of northern Siberia, whose center of breeding lies close to the northern pole of cold (see climate data). A number of traits, such as a thick winter coat, a small, fur-covered udder resp. scrotum, efficient thermoregulation, and low metabolic rates at low temperatures, lead to their extreme tolerance towards freezing temperatures. A compelling example of this is the case of several cows which survived on their own in the taiga forest for three months in late 2011 in deep snows and temperatures reaching as low as –40 °C (–40 °F).

== Status ==
In the wake of modernization and specialization in animal husbandry, many Turano-Mongolian breeds have been replaced either outright or through extensive crossbreeding by modern international breeds and become extinct. Thus, for example, of the Siberian breeds only the Yakutian cattle remain, and at that only in very small numbers. Others, like Japanese Black and the Kazakh Whiteheaded, have been diluted by crossbreeding with international breeds to varying degrees and often are threatened by further crossbreeding.

Many southern Turano-Mongolian breeds, especially the Central plain and Southern varieties of Chinese Yellow cattle, while showing pure taurine phenotypes, have in prehistorical and historical times been influenced by an admixture of zebu cattle.

Only a very few breeds of Turano-Mongolian cattle, as for example the Yakutian cattle, can still be called purebred.

== Scientific name ==
Turano-Mongolian cattle are a subgroup of domestic cattle, Bos primigenius forma taurus, and as such often called the Bos taurus turano-mongolicus group. They have previously also been classified as a distinct subspecies and even as a distinct species. The invalid scientific names resulting from these classifications are:

- Bos taurus orthoceros Stegmann von Pritzwald, 1906,
- Bos turano-mongolicus Kolesnik, 1936,
- Bos taurus turano-mongolicus (Kolesnik), 1936.

== List of breeds ==
(not necessarily comprehensive)

- Buryat cattle – extinct
- Chinese Yellow cattle (China)
  - Northern yellow cattle
    - Fuzhou cattle (China)
    - Yanbian cattle (China)
  - Central plain yellow cattle
    - Jinnan cattle
    - Luxi cattle
    - Nanyang cattle
    - Qinchuan cattle
    - Wanniu cattle – extinct
  - Southern yellow cattle
- Japanese Black (Japan) – crossbreed; with several strains in the different prefectures, e.g.
  - Matsusaka
  - Tajima
  - Yonezawa
- Japanese Brown (Japan)
- Japanese Polled (Japan)
- Japanese Shorthorn (Japan)
- Korean native cattle
  - Chikso
  - Hanwoo
  - Heugu
  - Jeju Black
- Kalmyk (a.k.a. Astrakhan cattle) (Asian steppe)
- Kazakh cattle (Asian steppe)
  - Kazakh cattle (Kazakhstan)
  - Kirgiz cattle (Kirgiztan)
  - Hazake cattle (China)
- Kuchinoshima (Japan)
- Menggu cattle (Inner Mongolia)
- Mishima (Japan)
- Mongolian cattle (Mongolia, incl. Inner Mongolia)
  - Dornod talyn Hevshil
  - Halhïn Gol (a.k.a. Khalkhun Golun)
  - Sanhe cattle (China) – crossbreed
  - Selenge cattle
- Siberian cattle (Siberia)
  - Altai cattle (a.k.a. South Siberian cattle) – extinct
  - Russo-Siberian cattle – extinct
  - West Siberian cattle – extinct
  - Yakutian cattle (a.k.a. East Siberian cattle) – purebred
- Tibetan cattle (Tibetan plateau)
- Wagyu (Japanese cattle outside Japan)
