= Yakutsk (disambiguation) =

Yakutsk is the capital of the Sakha Republic, Russia.

Yakutsk may also refer to:

- Yakutsk Urban Okrug, a municipal formation in the Sakha Republic, Russia, which the city of Yakutsk and eleven rural localities in its jurisdiction are incorporated as
- Platon Oyunsky Yakutsk International Airport, formerly known as Yakutsk Airport, an airport in the Sakha Republic, Russia
- Yakutsk Time, also referred to as Asia/Yakutsk, a time zone in Russia, ten hours ahead of UTC
- Yakutsk constituency, Russian legislative constituency
- Yakutsk electoral district (Russian Constituent Assembly election, 1917)

== See also ==
- Yakut (disambiguation)
