= Al-Azimi =

Muslim historian from Aleppo, from 1090-1161 CE

Abū ʿAbd Allāh Muḥammad ibn ʿAlī ibn Muḥammad al-Tanūkhī (Arabic: أبوعبدالله العظيمي), commonly known as al-ʿAẓīmī (1090–post-1161) was an Arab chronicler of the history of Aleppo.

Al-Azimi was a poet and school master in Aleppo. He was a contemporary of the Aleppine historians Hamdan ibn Abd al-Rahim al-Atharibi and Ali ibn Abdu-illah ibn Abi Jarada. He belonged to the Tanukhid tribe.

Al-Azimi authored a general annals of history of Syria beginning from the year 1063 and ending 1143/44 called Al Muwassal 'ala al-Asl al-Mu'assal. This work was published by Claude Cahen as La Chronique abrégée d'al-ʿAẓīmī in the French Journal asiatique in 1938. Al-Azimi also composed the influential Ta'rikh Halab (The History of Aleppo), which was a frequent source for the later histories of Aleppo by Ibn al-Adim and Ibn Abi Tayyi. According to Cahen,

The interest of the portions of al-'Azimi's work which have been preserved does not reside in their intrinsic value, but rather in the fact that they are the only texts which escaped the destruction of North Syrian historiography between the middle of the 5th/9th century and that of the 6th/12th century; they thus enable us, to a certain extent, to complete or criticise the great works of the following century, on which we are dependent for the history of this period, by bringing us closer to their sources: a necessary test in view of the changes which had taken place in the meantime in the Syrian moral and social climate.

Most of al-Azimi's work have been lost, with the exception of the portions published by Cahen. According to the Syrian historian Suhayl Zakkar, despite what little survives, the information al-Azimi provides is "very valuable" for the history of Aleppo in the 11th century. Part of his work covers the reigns of the Mirdasid princes of Aleppo Shibl al-Dawla Nasr, Mu'izz al-Dawla Thimal and Rashid al-Dawla Mahmud, their relations with the Fatimid Caliphate, the collapse of the dynasty, the rise of the first Seljuk ruler of Aleppo Aq Sunqur al-Hajib, and the era of the Zengids.

== Bibliography ==
- Al-Azzawi, Abbas (1943). "Al-Azimi and his History" (PDF). Arab Academy Journal (in Arabic). 18: 201. "and he was an Arab Tanukhi"
- Cahen, Cl. (1960). "Al-ʿAẓīmī". In Gibb, H. A. R.; Kramers, J. H.; Lévi-Provençal, E.; Schacht, J.; Lewis, B. & Pellat, Ch. (eds.). The Encyclopaedia of Islam, Second Edition. Volume I: A–B. Leiden: E. J. Brill. p. 823. OCLC 495469456.
- El-Azhari, Taef (2016). Zengi and the Muslim Response to the Crusades: The Politics of Jihad. Abingdon, Oxon: Routledge. ISBN 978-1-138-82101-9.
- Setton, Kenneth (1969). A History of the Crusades, Vol. I. University of Pennsylvania Press.
- Zakkar, Suheil (1969). The Emirate of Aleppo 392/1002–487/1094 (PDF) (PhD). London: University of London.
