= Kazakh Whiteheaded =

Breed of cattle

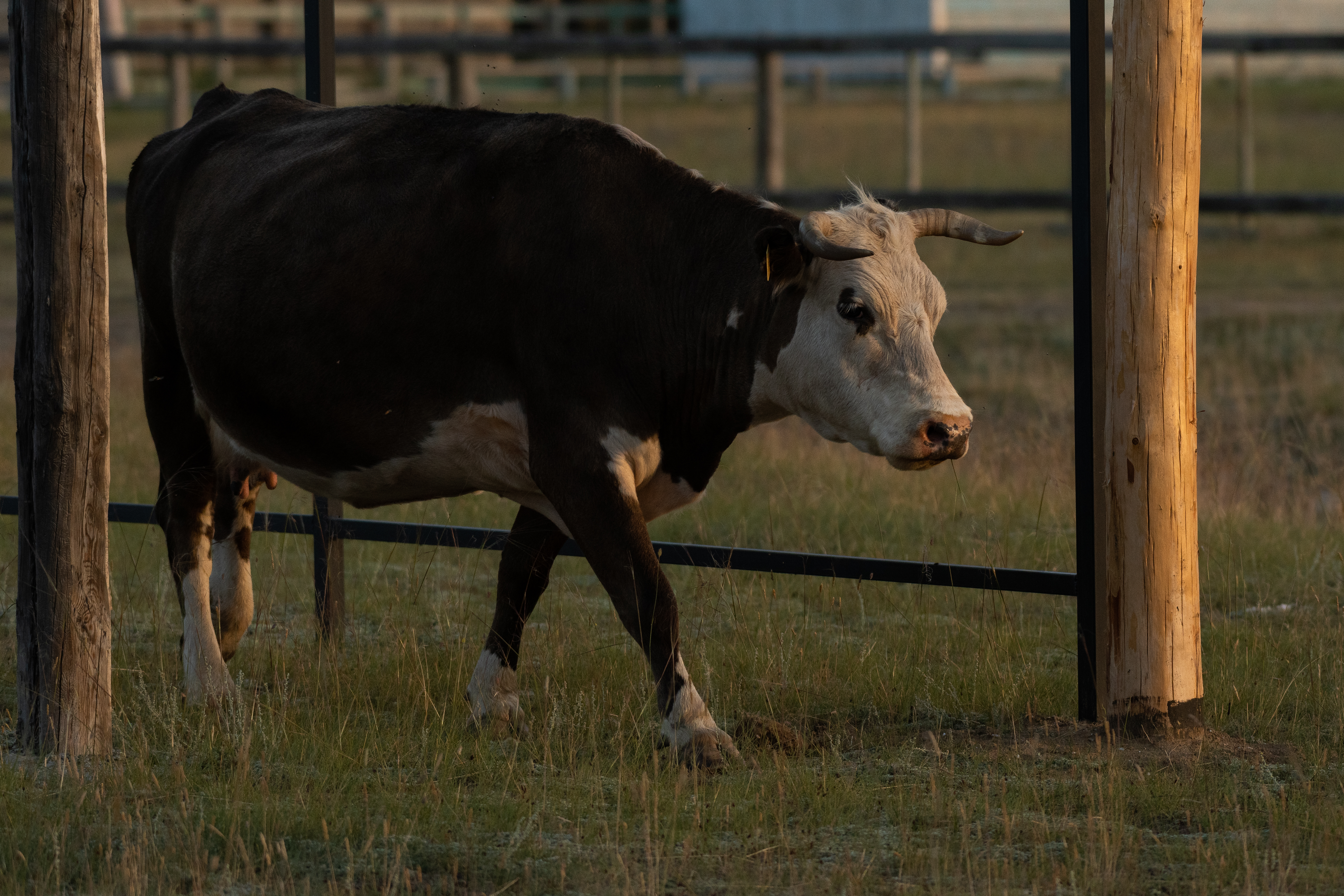
- Other names: Kazakh: Қазақтың ақбас сиыры; Qazaqtyñ aqbas siyry; Russian: Kaзaxcкaя бeлoгoлoвaя; Kazakhskaya Belogolovaya
- Distribution: Azerbaijan; Kazakhstan; Mongolia; Tajikistan; Uzbekistan
- Use: meat

Traits
- Weight: Male: average 820 kg; Female: average 550 kg
- Height: Male: 133 cm; Female: 124 cm
- Horn status: horned

The Kazakh Whiteheaded is a breed of beef cattle from Kazakhstan and Russia. The breed was developed between 1930 and 1950 on state farms in the Kazakh republic and the Lower Volga by crossing Hereford cattle with local Kazakh and Kalmyk stock. The breed resembles the Hereford in colour and conformation while incorporating the hardiness of the local breeds. In 1990 the population of the breed in Kazakhstan was estimated at 1,334,000.
