= San Giovanni in Fistola =

- San Giovanni in Fistola (Italian)
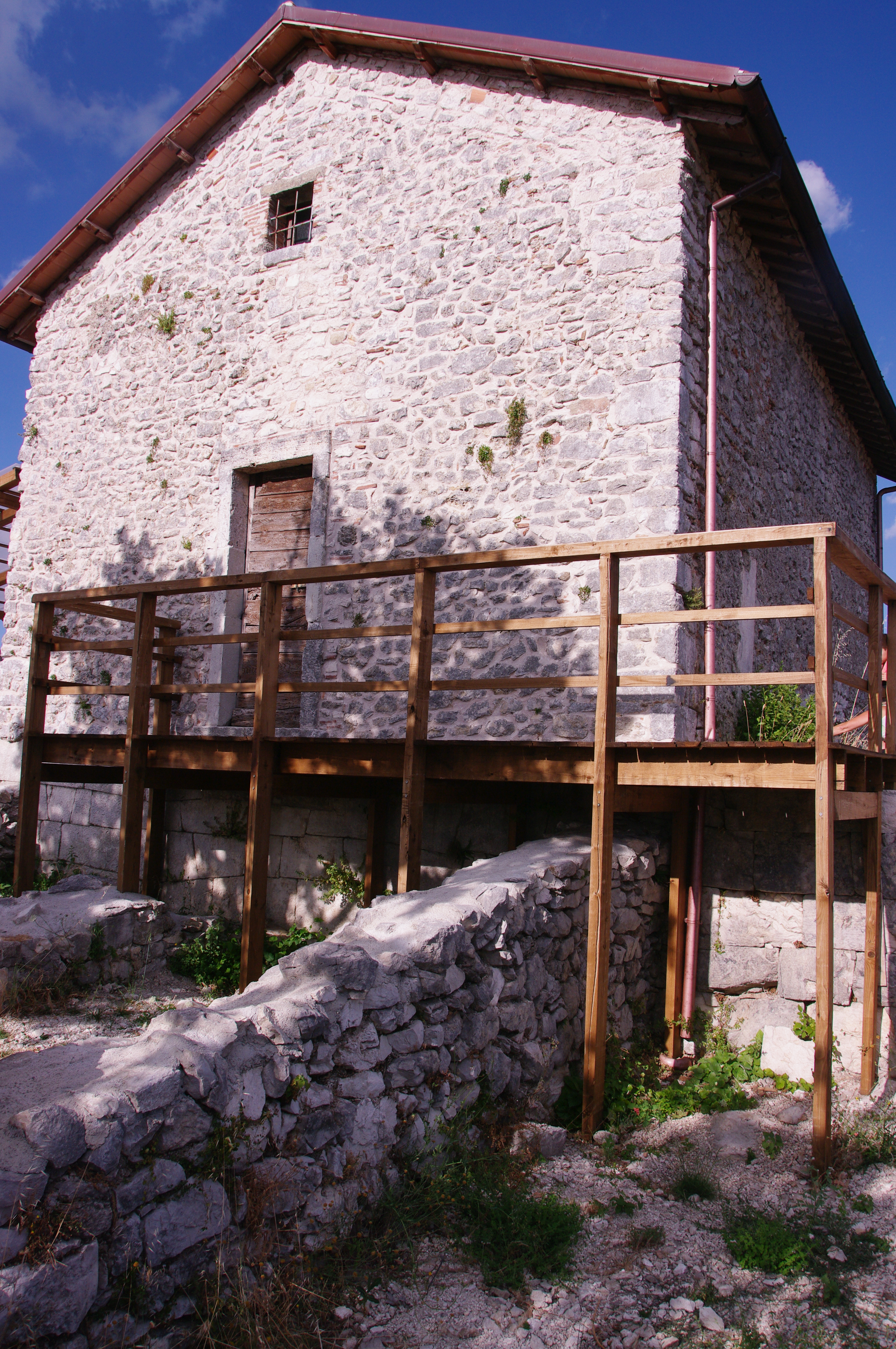
- San Giovanni in Fistola

- Location within Italy
- 42°09′05″N 13°02′05″E
- Type: Roman sanctuary, Medieval church, Medieval monastery
- Periods: Ancient Roman to Medieval
- Location: Collalto Sabino, Province of Rieti, Latium, Italy
- Region: Latium

History
- Built: Roman: 3rd and 2nd Centuries BC; Medieval: 9th and 11th Centuries AD

Site notes
- Excavation dates: June 2012
- Management: Superintendency of Archaeology, Fine Arts and Landscape for the Metropolitan Area of Rome and the Province of Rieti (SABAP-RM-RI)
- Public access: Yes

San Giovanni in Fistola is an archaeological site located in the municipality of Collalto Sabino (Rieti, Italy). Excavations in 2012 revealed three phases of archaeological development. First frequented in the Roman period as a temple dedicated to Jupiter, this site later transitioned into a church dedicated to St John the Baptist in the 9th century. A monastery was then erected in addition to the church in the 11th century. Today, only the church still survives, however, this site continues to be of importance to the local region with pilgrimages occurring annually.

== Archaeological research ==
Archaeological investigations were carried out in June 2012 within the project “Itinerario storico religioso: dal mulino di Nespolo all’area storico archeologica di Montagliano sfondato passando per la chiesa di S. Giovanni in Fistola" (Historical and Religious Itinerary: from the Mill of Nespolo to the Historic-Archaeological Area of Montagliano Sfondato via the Church of San Giovanni in Fistola), funded by the Regione Lazio Government. The aim of the project was to support the site's conservation and facilitate a public opening.

=== Roman period ===
The earliest occupation of the site was a rural Roman sanctuary dedicated to Jupiter. Based on archaeological finds the sanctuary is believed to have reached its peak of frequentation between the 3rd and early 2nd Centuries BC. Identification of this Roman sanctuary is based on the archaeological discovery of the remains of a wall made of large polygonal stone blocks, which has been interpreted as a podium.

The most relevant archaeological evidence dating to this period is the discovery of a votive pit containing terracotta figurines, anatomical votives, Republican bronze coins, colourful glass beads, and pot sherds primarily dating to the Republican period as well as some also belonging to the Imperial period, which is testimony to later, yet sporadic, occupancy of the site.

The identification of the sanctuary as dedicated to Jupiter is based on the limestone inscription discovered alongside the remains of the later monastery. The inscription reads a dedication to Iuppiter Pollens, with the adjective Pollens coming from the Latin verb pollēre “to be powerful”, “to be strong”.

M(arcus) Gavi(us) L(uci) [f(ilius)] | Iovei Pol<l>ent(ei) d(onum) d(edit) l(ibens) [m(erito)]

=== Medieval church ===
A medieval church was erected on the podium of the former Roman sanctuary. It is the principal surviving structure of the archaeological site, first recorded in the Farfa charters in 875 as a church dedicated to St John the Baptist, the building is a simple single-nave structure with a semicircular apse reflective of modern restoration. The inscription dedicated to Iuppiter is preserved on the southern wall.

=== Monastery ===
According to the Farfa charters of 1074–1075, the monastery of San Giovanni in Fistola was founded between 1038 and 1048 by Count Berardo II. It was built immediately North of the church and had the typical layout of Italian medieval monastic architecture.

Archaeological excavations uncovered the remains of the cloister, service buildings, a cistern, and a cemetery containing burials dating from the 11th to the 13th centuries. The monastery was abandoned by the mid-12th century, whilst the church continued to function as a place of religious practice and pilgrimage.

== Local tradition ==
Every year on the 24th of June, local pilgrims head to the church to celebrate the feast of St John the Baptist. According to local tradition, visitors place a stone on the "Macerone dei Frati", a large pile of stones near the church. This custom is linked to the legend of Cleomira, who is said to be the guardian of a temple dedicated to the goddess Vacuna that once stood on the summit. After she was killed by invaders, she was buried beneath the Macerone dei Frati, where pilgrims continue to leave stones in her memory. Archaeological excavations, however, have shown that the ancient sanctuary was actually dedicated to Jupiter rather than Vacuna.

== See also ==
- Collalto Sabino
- Pietrascritta (funerary monument)
- Necropolis at Fontanelle
