= Southern Yellow cattle =

Chinese grouping of cattle breeds

The Southern Yellow is a group of cattle breeds distributed in southern China. It is one of the three principal groups within the overall Chinese Yellow cattle population, which includes all indigenous Chinese cattle of both Bos taurus and Bos indicus origin, as well as hybrids between the two species; Chinese people traditionally do not distinguish between these. The other two major groupings are the Northern Yellow and the Central Plains Yellow.

== Classification ==
In 2001 a total of fifty-two breeds – taurine, zebuine or hybrid – were listed within the overall Chinese Yellow grouping, which does not include cattle substantially influenced by imported breeds. Breeds within the Southern Yellow or Changzhu group include the Leiqiong, the Minnan, the Panjiang, the Wuling and the Yunnan Humped. The group is distributed in the Anhui, Fujian, Guangdong, Guizhou, Hainan, Hubei, Jiangxi, Sichuan, southern Shaanxi, Yunnan and Zhejiang provinces of southern China.

A slightly different classification of the Chinese native breeds has been proposed on the basis of genetic studies. The proposed groupings are: a Mongolian group in the north and north-west of the country; a southern group of principally zebuine origin, with some genetic input from the banteng, Bos javanicus; and an intermediate group in the central part of the country, consisting mainly of taurindicine hybrids. The small Tibetan breed is not assigned to any of these three groups.

== Characteristics ==
Cattle in the Southern Yellow group are generally smaller than those in the other two major groupings. They are compact, sturdy and short-legged, with good heat tolerance and some resistance to ticks and to piroplasmosis. They are usually humped, with a large dewlap; the horns, hooves and muzzle are normally black.

== Use ==
Cattle in this group are generally of draught conformation, with little aptitude for beef production. They are commonly shallow in the chest, and carry little rump muscle; meat yields are generally low.

Milk yields of Chinese Yellow cattle in general is within the range 500–900 kg in a lactation of 180–270 days. The low milk yield is a limiting factor in the growth rate of calves.
