= Yakutian cattle =

Breed of cattle

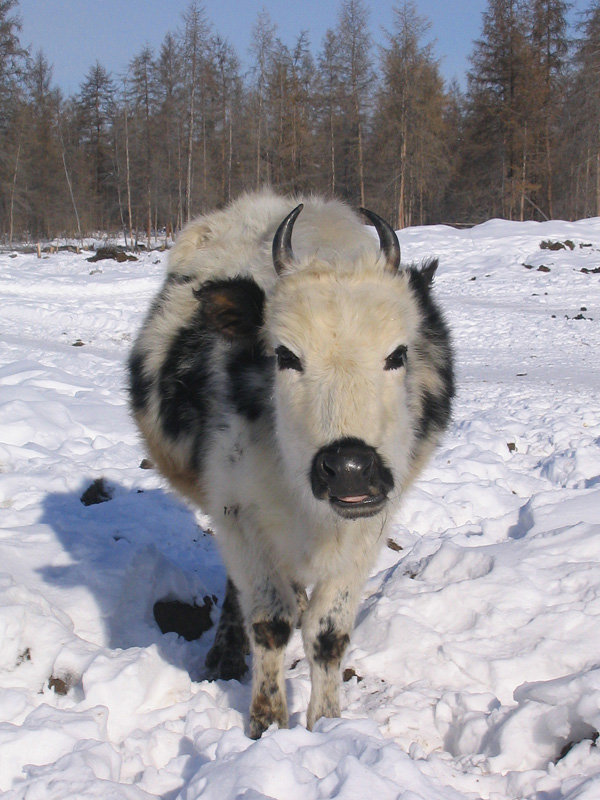
- Conservation status: Endangered
- Other names: Yakut cattle, East Siberian cattle
- Country of origin: Sakha Republic (Siberia, Russia)
- Distribution: Sakha Republic
- Use: Triple-purpose beef / dairy / (draft); extreme tolerance towards freezing temperatures, exceptional foraging ability

Traits
- Weight: Male: 500–600 kg; Female: 350–400 kg
- Height: Male: 115–127 cm; Female: 110–112 cm
- Coat: Black, red, or spotted; most animals have a white dorsal stripe
- Horn status: Horned; variable shape and direction

Notes
- Protected by the world’s first conservation law for a domestic breed
- Cattle; Bos (primigenius) taurus

Yakutian cattle, Саха ынаҕа (Saxa ınağa) in the Sakha language, are a cattle landrace bred north of the Arctic Circle in the Republic of Sakha. They are noted for their extreme hardiness and tolerance towards freezing temperatures.

== Description ==
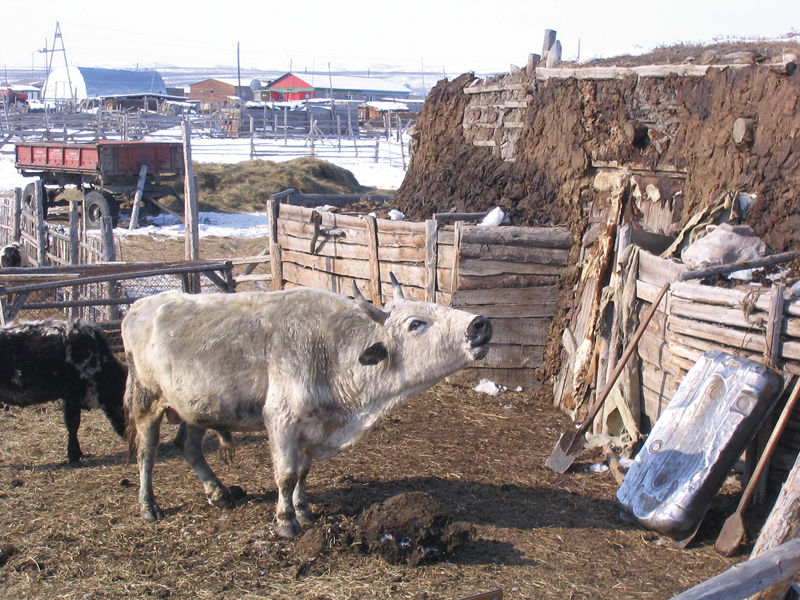
A Yakutian bull

Yakutian cattle are relatively small in size. The cows stand between 110 and 112 cm (43 and 44 in) high at the withers and reach a live weight of 350 to 400 kg (770 to 880 lb); bulls reach a height of 115 to 127 cm (45 to 50 in) and weigh 500 to 600 kg (1,100 to 1,300 lb). They have short, strong legs and a deep but relatively narrow chest. The dewlap is well-developed. Their color varies. It can be black, red, or spotted. Most animals have a white dorsal stripe along the back, and in dark animals the hair between the horns is often reddish brown.

Their large abdomen and long digestive tract allow them to make efficient use both of grass and browse. They grow subcutaneous fat very quickly during the short pasture season and survive under poor feed conditions in winter.

A number of further traits, such as a thick winter coat, a small, fur-covered udder or scrotum, efficient thermoregulation, and low metabolic rates at low temperatures, lead to the Yakutian cattle's extreme tolerance towards freezing temperatures. A compelling example of this is the case of several cows which survived on their own in the taiga forest for three months in late 2011 in deep snows and temperatures reaching as low as –40 °C (–40 °F).

Yakutian cattle exhibit resistance to tuberculosis, leucosis, and brucellosis.

== Relationship to other cattle ==
Yakutian cattle belong to the East Asian Turano-Mongolian group of taurine cattle. This group of cattle may represent a fourth Aurochs domestication event (and a third event among Bos taurus–type aurochs) and may have diverged from the Near East group some 35,000 years ago. Yakutian cattle are the last remaining native Turano-Mongolian cattle breed in Siberia, and one of only a few pure Turano-Mongolian breeds remaining worldwide.

Of the five mtDNA haplogroups (T, T1, T2, T3, T4) found in existing taurine cattle breeds, T2, T3 and T4 appear in Yakutian cattle, as in the Turano-Mongolian group in general. T4 is found only in the East Asian breeds, T1 is only found in Near Eastern breeds and T is found in both Near Eastern and European breeds. T2 and T3 appear in the breeds of all three regions.

Studies of autosomal DNA markers show a high genetic distinctiveness and point to a long-term genetic isolation from other breeds; geographic isolation beyond the normal northern limit of the species range can be assumed to be the cause.

== Uses ==
Yakutian cattle are a triple-purpose breed that produce milk and meat and have also been used as draft animals.

The average milk yield is approximately 1,000 kg per year. Yakutian cows have a rich milk, with an average fat content of 5.03% and an average protein content of 4.69%.

The meat of Yakutian cattle is known for its natural marbling.

== History ==
The Yakutian cattle are descended from the indigenous Siberian cattle breeds. The Sakha (i.e. Yakuts) brought it from the southern Baikal region to the lower reaches of the Lena, the Yana, the Indigirka and the Kolyma rivers when they migrated northward in the 13th century. Together with the Yakutian horse, it was the basis of the Sakha culture of meat and dairy livestock in the harsh conditions of the Russian Far North.

Yakutian cattle were purebred until 1929, but then an extensive crossbreeding with the more productive Simmental cattle and Kholmogory cattle began. While many other landraces were lost in this era, the Yakutian cattle was saved by traditional cattle breeders and individual scientists.

== Present situation ==
Currently there are approximately 1200 purebred Yakutian cattle, all of them in the Sakha Republic (Yakutia) of the Russian Federation. The breeding population consists of only 525 breeding cows and 28 breeding bulls, the rest are mostly dairy cows. Consequently, the Yakutian cattle are classified as an endangered breed by the Food and Agriculture Organization of the United Nations (FAO).

74% of the cattle are to be found the Eveno-Bytantaysky District, 150 km north of the polar circle on the lower reaches of the Lena River and close to the northern pole of cold (see climate data), the others were moved to the southern part of the Sakha Republic in the first years of this century. They are kept by private farmers and by farming co-operatives and it is also common for non-farming households to keep a few head for private use. The largest herd is held on the experimental farm of the Agricultural Research Institute of Yakutia. The breeding records are maintained by the Laboratory of Cattle Breeding of the Yakutian Research Institute of Agriculture in Yakutsk.

Their adaption to the extreme climatic conditions of northern Siberia, their genetic distinctiveness and resulting high genetic value for the maintenance of cattle diversity, and their cultural value have led to conservation efforts which resulted in the Russian Federation passing a law to protect and conserve them, the world's first conservation law for a domestic breed.

== See also ==
- Yakutian horse
- Yakutian Laika
- Yakutian knife

== Literature ==
- Leo Granberg, Katriina Soini, Juha Kantanen (eds.): Sakha Ynaga. Cattle of the Yakuts. Annales Academiae Scientiarum Fennicae. Humaniora 355. Helsinki: Finnish Academy of Science and Letters, 2009. ISBN 978-951-41-1032-0. ISSN 1239-6982. Introductory chapter as pdf.
