= Yakutian horse =

Breed of horse

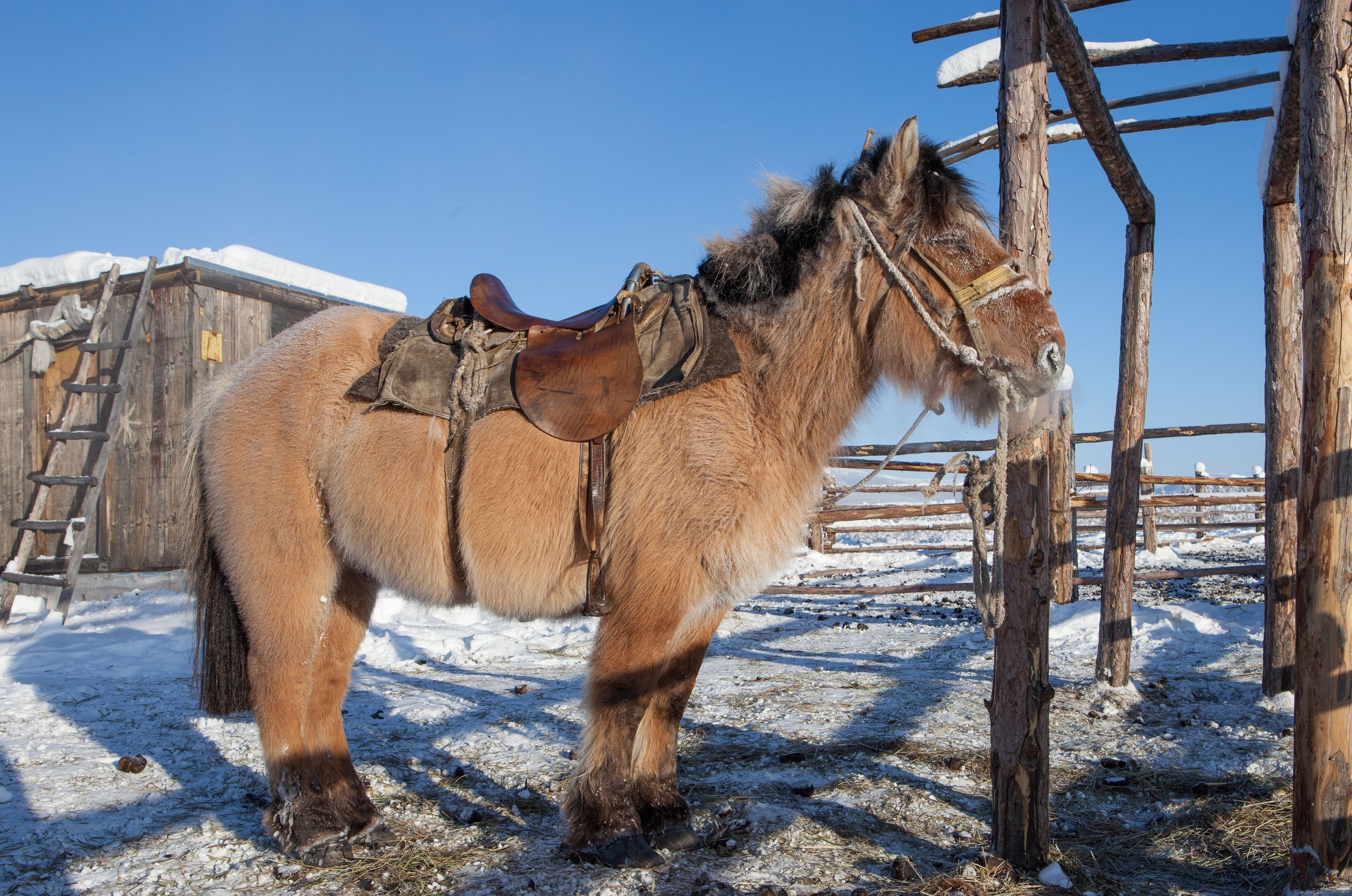
- Conservation status: FAO (2007): not at risk
- Other names: Yakut
- Country of origin: Russia
- Distribution: Yakutia

Traits
- Weight: 450 kg
- Height: Male: 140 cm; Female: 136 cm

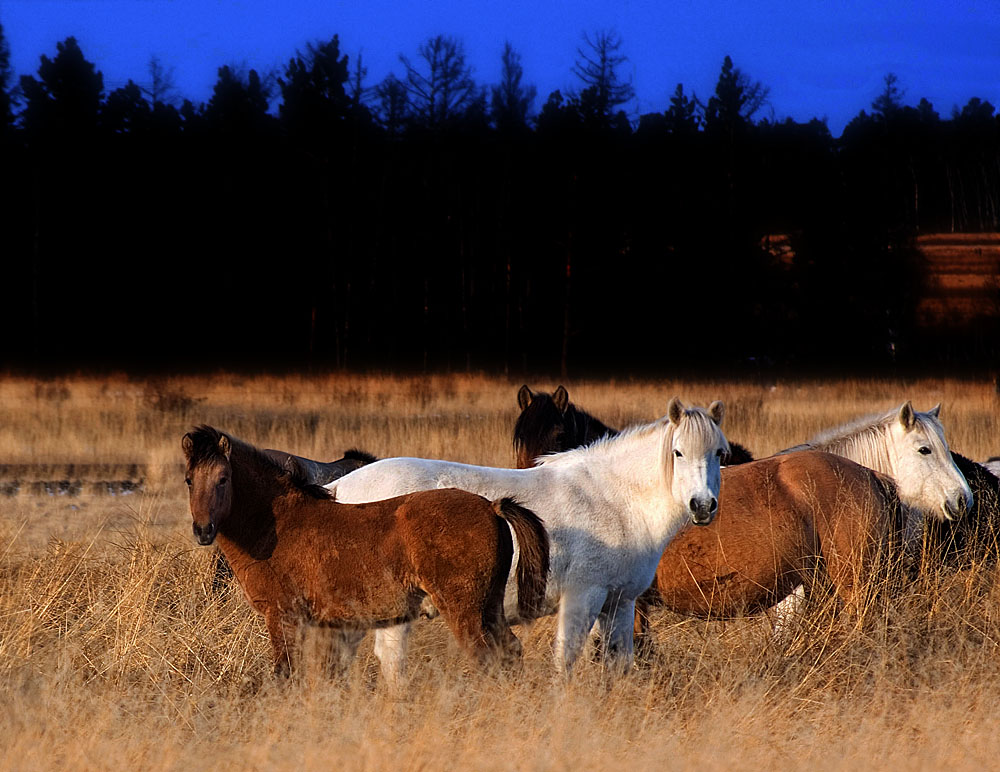
In summer

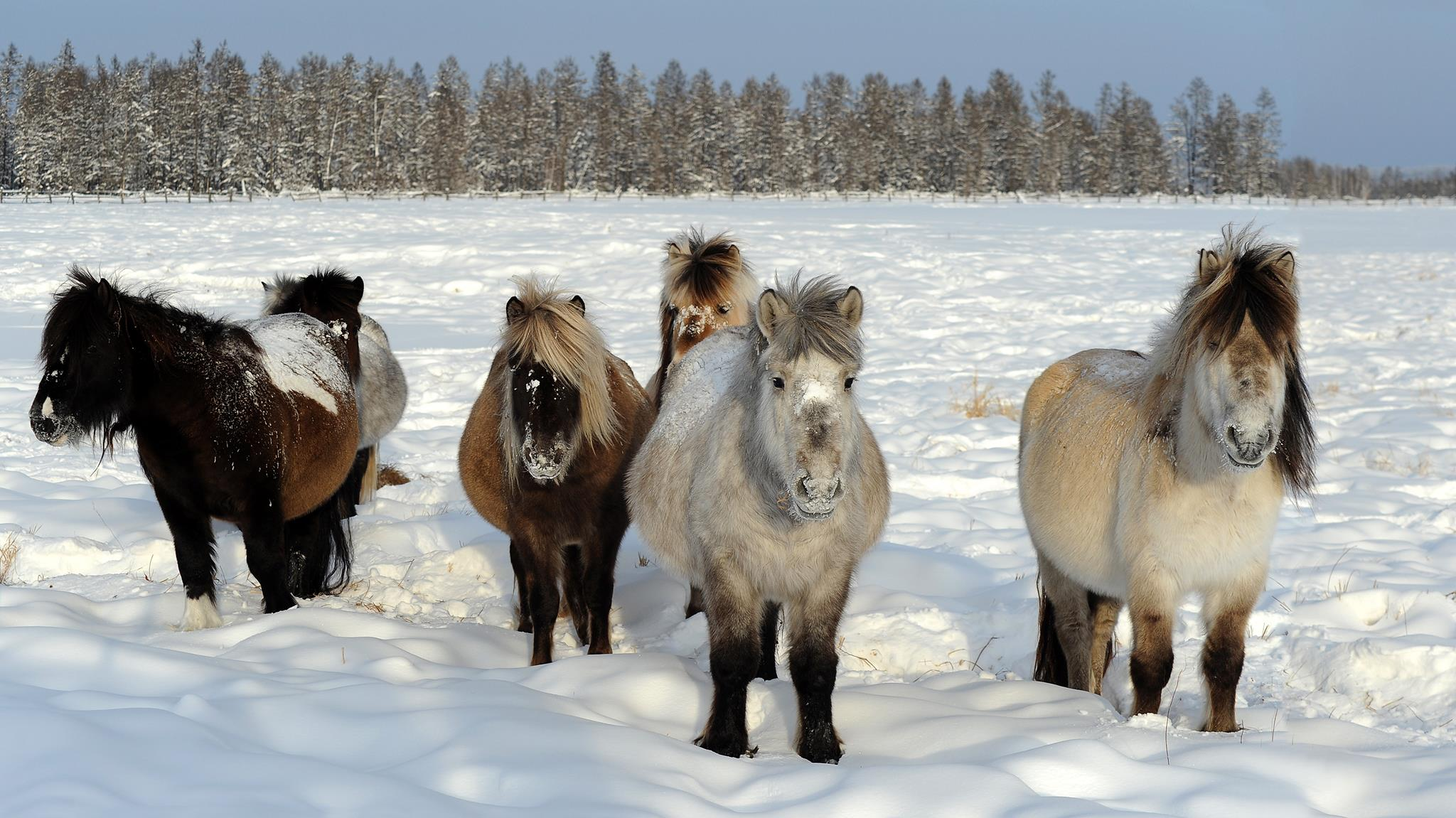
In winter

The Yakutian (Yakut: Саха ата, romanized: Sakha ata) or Yakut is a native horse breed from Sakha (Yakutia) in the region of Siberia in Russia. It is somewhat larger than the otherwise similar Mongolian horse and wild subspecies, the Przewalski's horse. It is noted for its adaptation to the extreme cold climate of Yakutia, including the ability to locate and graze on vegetation that is under deep snow cover, and to survive without shelter in temperatures that reach −70 °C (−94 °F).

The horses appear to have evolved from domesticated horses brought with the Yakuts when they migrated to the area beginning in the 13th century, and are not descended from wild horses known to inhabit the area in Neolithic times.

== Varieties and characteristics ==
The breed averages 140 centimetres (13.3 hands) in stallions and 136 cm (13.2 h) in mares, and shares certain outward characteristics with other northern breeds like the Shetland pony, Fjord horse and Icelandic horse, including sturdy stature, thick mane and heavy hair coat, their coat ranging from 8 to 15 centimeters.

There are several subtypes of the Yakutian horse. The Northern type is the purest bred Yakut, and is sometimes called the Middle Kolyma or Verkhoyansk horse. It is usually bay, gray or light dun in color, with primitive markings including a dark dorsal stripe and zebra-pattern stripes on the legs. Stallions measure 139 cm (13.3 h) at withers on average, mares are 137 cm (13.2 h). This variety is considered to be the most valuable. The second variety is the Smaller Southern type, which is also considered a pure but less valuable breed. Average height is 135 cm (13.1 h) in stallions and 132 cm (13.0 h) in mares. The third variety is the Larger Southern type, which is the result of cross-breeding with other breeds, and is widespread in central Yakutia. This type measures 141 cm (14.0 h) in stallions and 136 cm (13.2 h) in mares.

== Adaptation to the Siberian environment ==
In Siberia, annual temperatures fluctuate between +38 and −70 °C (100 and −94 °F) and winter may last for 8 months. Yakutian horses are kept unstabled year-round, and in the roughly 800 years that they have been present in Siberia, they have evolved a range of remarkable morphologic, metabolic and physiologic adaptations to this harsh environment.

- While smaller than modern highly derived horse breeds, they are larger than other primitive horse breeds (Bergmann's rule); at the same time they have a compact build with a stouter trunk and legs that are relatively short in proportion to the horse's size (Allen's rule).
- Their winter coat is extremely dense and reaches a hair length of 8 cm (3.1 in).
- Their metabolism adjusts to seasonal needs. In fall they accumulate large fat reserves, in winter the metabolic rate is lowered, and in spring they show an increased carbohydrate metabolism, making use of the freshly sprouting grass.
- They show an increased production of antifreezing compounds.
- They may further avoid frostbite by reducing the volume of circulating blood during times of extreme cold, as indicated by an increased responsiveness of their genetic networks involved in oxidative stress responses, vasodilation, and blood coagulation.

Genetically they show indications of convergent evolution with other inhabitants of the Far North like mammoths regarding their adaptation to the extreme cold.

== Uses ==
The Yakut is reared primarily for its meat, which is considered a delicacy by locals due to a plentiful fat layer. The milk is also used, mostly for making kumis. Despite its small stature, the Yakut is valued for its riding capabilities.

== See also ==
- Yakutian cattle
- Yakutian Laika
- Equus lenensis extinct wild horse native to Yakutia/Sakha
