= Yakutian Laika =

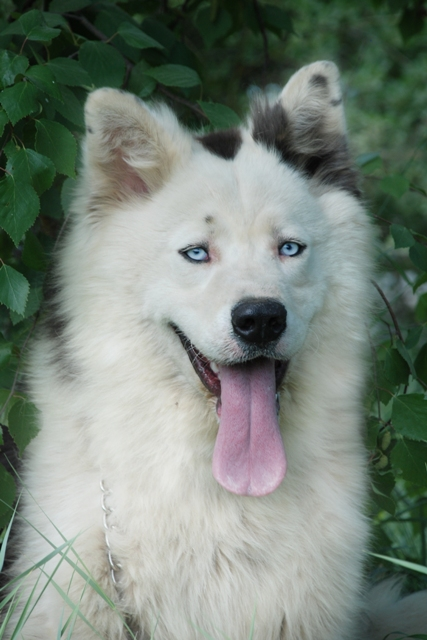
- Other names: Yakut Laika, Yakustkaya Laika, Kolyma-Indigirka Laika, Laïka de Iakoutie, Chien de Traîneau de Yakutie, Laika de Yakutia, Kolyma Husky
- Origin: Russia
Traits
Height	Males	55–59 centimetres (22–23 in)
	Females	53–57 centimetres (21–22 in)
- Coat: Double coated, with a thick downy undercoat, and a longer, more coarse top coat.
- Colour: White and any patching as bicolour or tricolour.
Kennel club standards
- Fédération Cynologique Internationale: standard

The Yakutian Laika (Russian: Якутская лайка) is a recently recognized dog breed originating from the Yakutia region of Siberia. In ancient times, the dogs were employed by the native Yakute people as universal animals. Yakutian Laikas are multipurpose laikas, with many lineages able to herd reindeer, hunt game, and/or pull a sled. They are registered with the Russian Kennel Club, the Fédération Cynologique Internationale, and the AKC's Foundation Stock Service in 2017. In 2024, they were moved to the Miscellaneous Group in AKC.

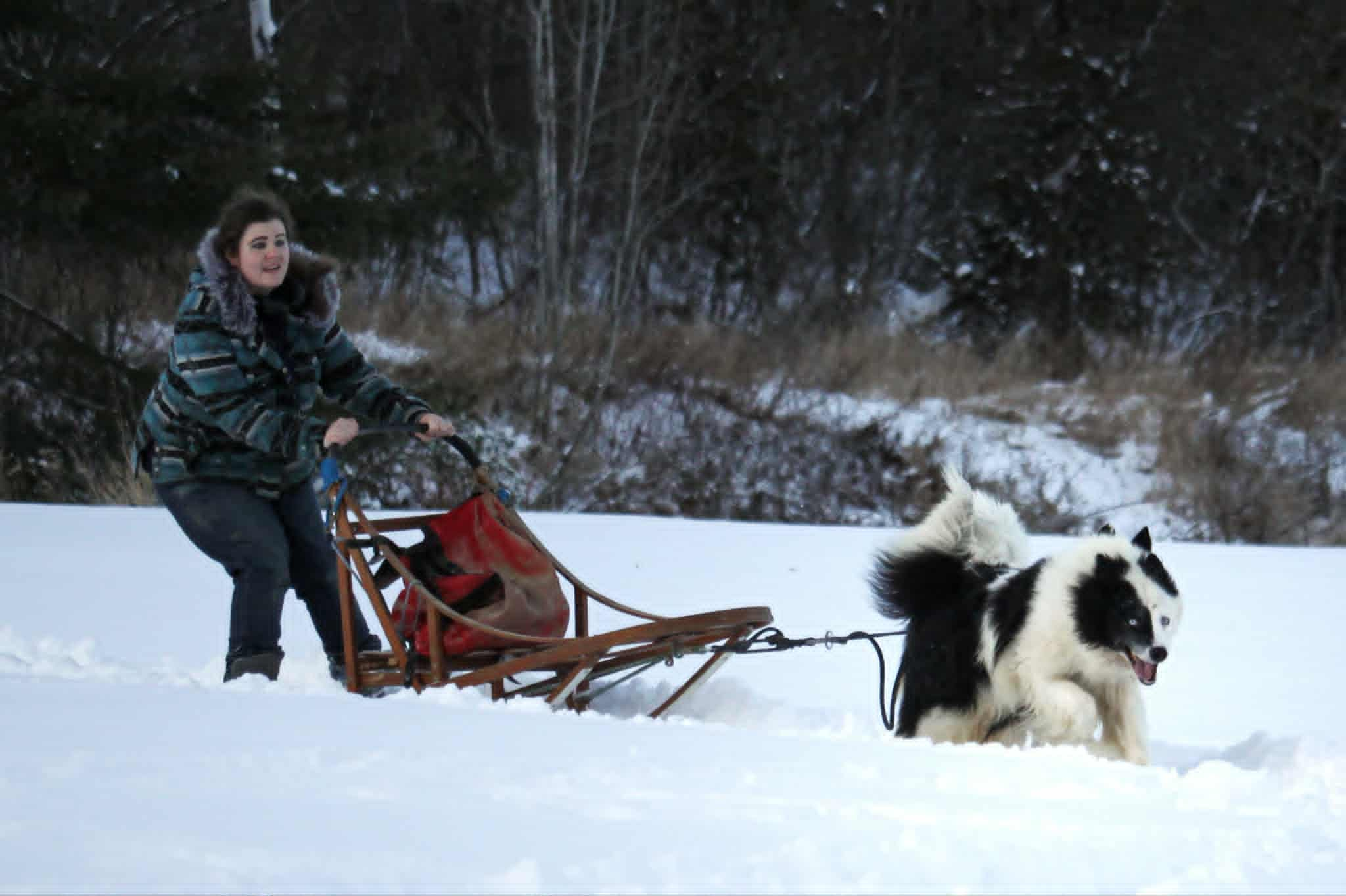
An example of Yakutian Laikas pulling a sled

== History ==
Yakutian Laikas are a breed with ancient origins developed by native Yakuts for hunting mammals and birds, herding livestock, and hauling game. The dogs were indispensable assistants and companions. In the Sakha language, this breed is known as "Sakha yta", meaning "Yakut dog". Evidence of this breed can be found in archaeological remains dating 12,500 years ago. Remnants of dog sleds and harnesses has been found with dog remains in the Sakha republic. Radiocarbon dates to 7800–8000 years ago.

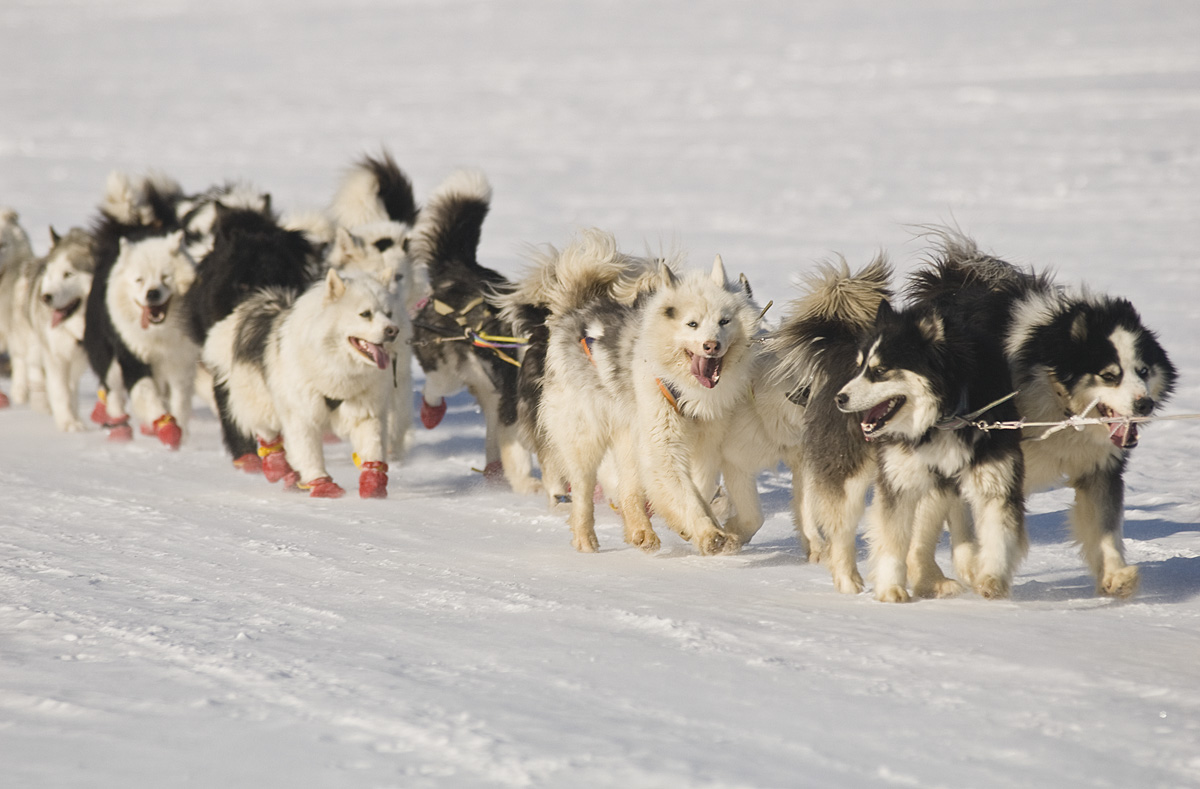
Yakutian Laikas as sled dogs

The first scientific descriptions of Yakutian Laikas were published in the late 18th century, when geographic studies of the north were conducted by Prince Shirinsky-Shikhmatov. He wrote in his monograph about Laikas: “Researchers of the north, of course, could not overlook northern dog; they could not disagree with hard fact that presence of this dog makes life of northern people possible. In 1896, Vlatslav Seroshevsky published the book “Yakuts.” Seroshevsky divides them into two groups, 1) guarding and hunting dogs and 2) maritime sled dogs. He wrote: “even most poor Yakut having no other animals, has at least one dog”.

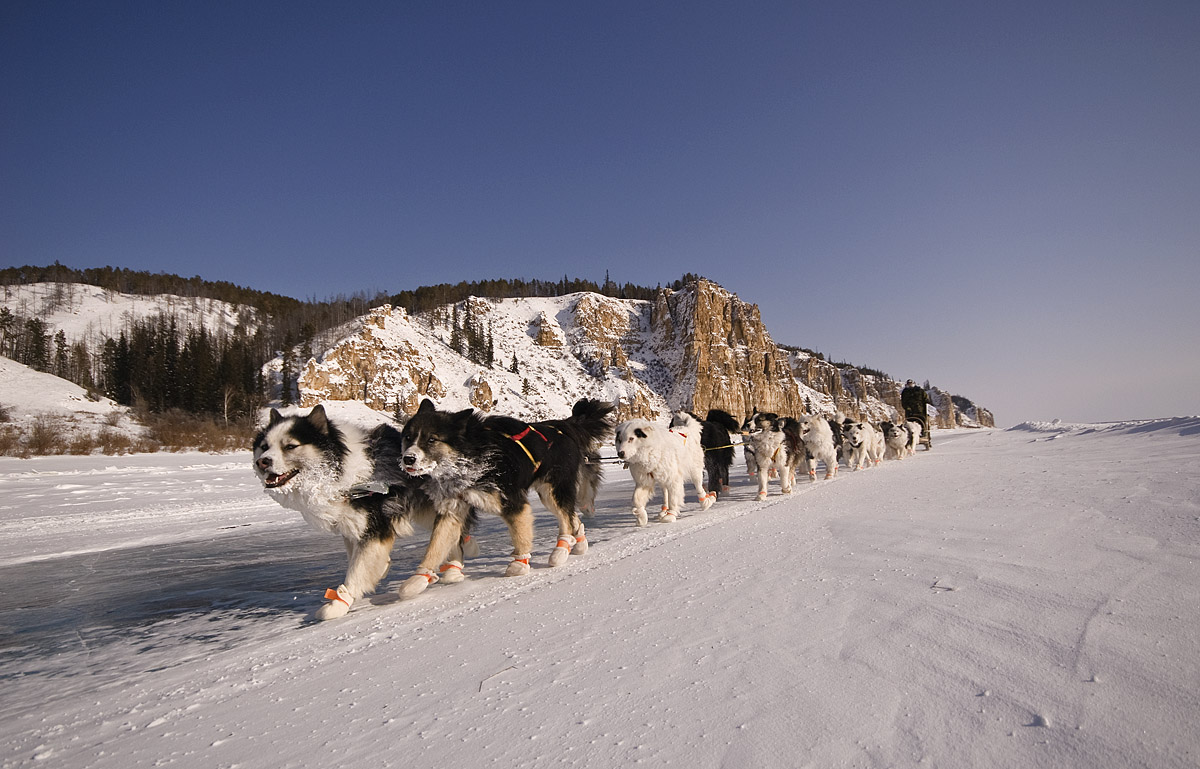
Yakutian Laikas as sled dogs

From the 1940s to the 1990s, Yakutian Laika numbers were in decline. Breed population reached an all-time low of 3,000 in 1998 before revival efforts began. Reasons for their decline include:

- the introduction of mechanization in the Arctic,
- reduced capacity to keep dogs, especially with reduced fish catches and collectivization of farming and reindeer herding,
- decline of fur hunting,
- and the introduction of disease.

== Characteristics ==
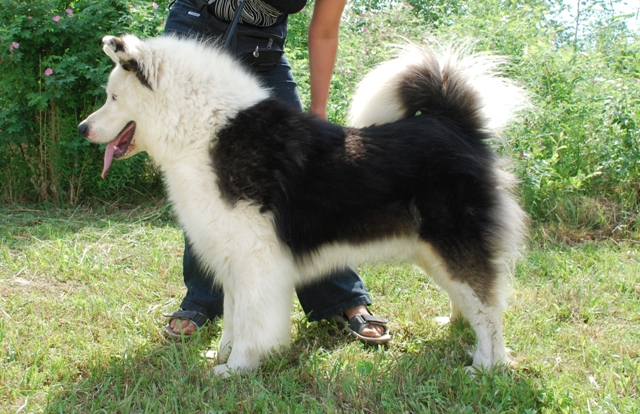
Yakutian Laika, Tugrik

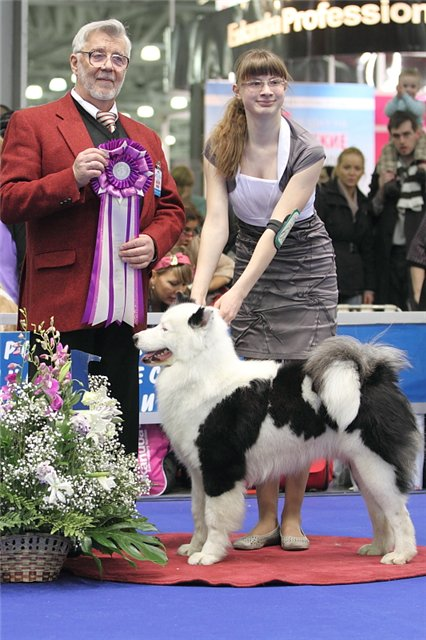
Arcturus North Star – Champion of Russia, Eurasia, RKF, National Club Winner Yakutian Laika

Yakutian Laikas are generally versatile with an excellent sense of smell, hearing, vision, strong hunting drive, and endurance; they are aggressive to predators and gentle to humans if properly socialized from a young age. Whereas most aboriginal laika breeds are predominantly hunting dogs, the Yakutian Laika is predominantly a sled dog that also retain rudimentary hunting and herding abilities. However, due to the vastness of Yakutia, Yakutian Laika can be specialized to fulfill the needs of different regions. There are an estimated 200 that are exclusively hunting dogs. Yakutian Laikas are generally tolerant regarding living conditions and easily endure the hostile climate of northern Siberia. In harsh Siberian conditions, they reveal their stamina; they tend to work in small groups and can work through the whole day, from dawn to sunset.

== Cloning ==
Two Yakutian Laika were cloned in 2017 in an effort to preserve the critically endangered breed. In 2020, one of the cloned dogs successfully whelped a litter of 7 puppies.

== See also ==
- Yakuts
- Yakutian horse
- Yakutian cattle
