= Kalmyk cattle =

Cattle

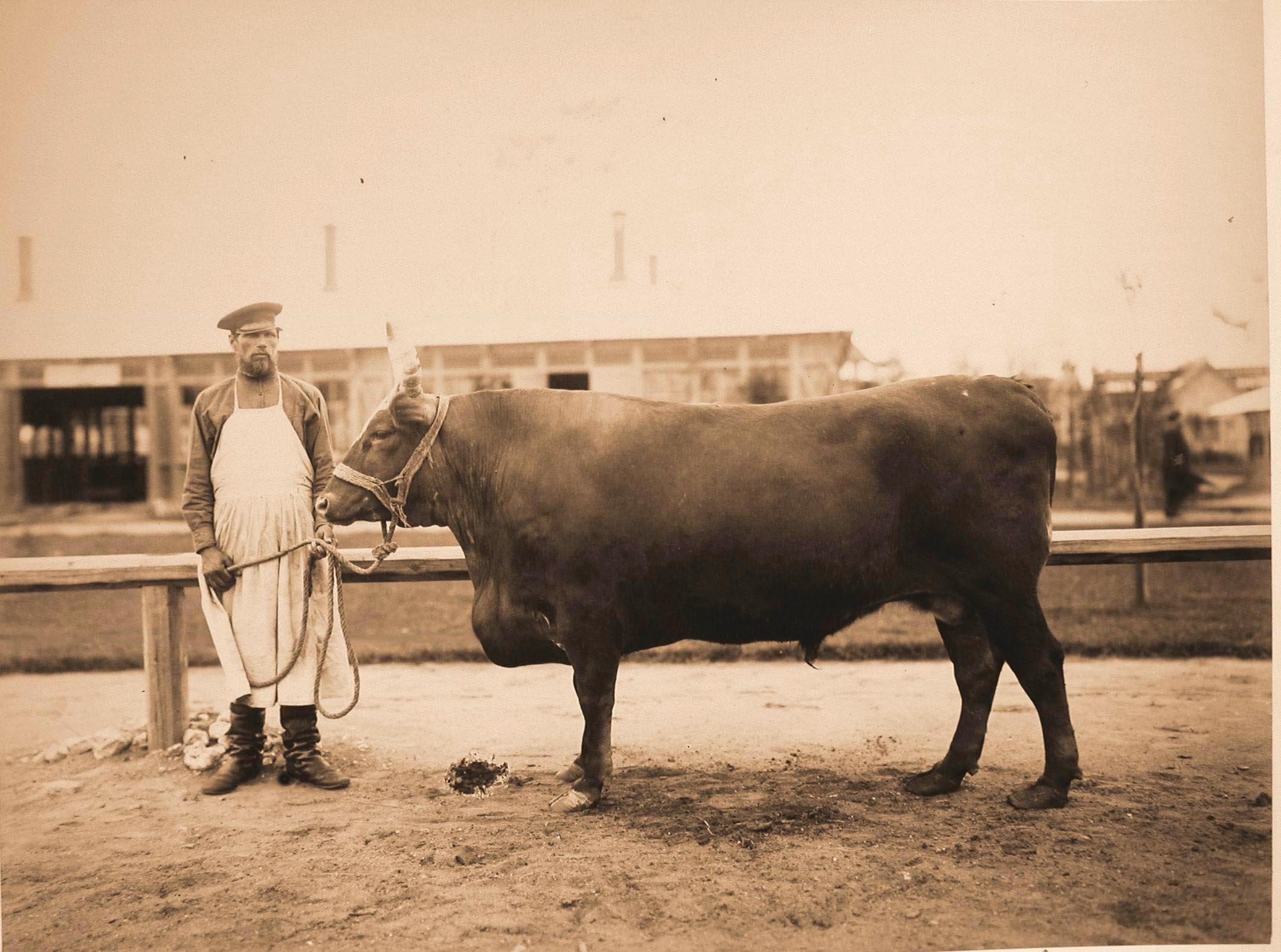
- Bull at the Moscow breeding cattle exhibition, 1896
- Conservation status: FAO (2007): not at risk; DAD-IS (2023): unknown
- Other names: Russian: Калмыцкая; Kalmytskaya
- Country of origin: western Mongolia, southern Altai
- Distribution: Russian Federation; Kazakhstan; Tajikistan
- Use: Livestock

Traits
- Weight: Male: 720 kg; Female: 430 kg
- Height: Male: 135 cm; Female: 126 cm
- Coat: red of various shades; white markings on head, belly and legs; pale muzzle
- Horn status: horned; short, upward pointing

Notes
- known for their extreme hardiness; belong to the group of Turano-Mongolian cattle
- Cattle; Bos (primigenius) taurus

Kalmyk cattle (Russian: Калмыцкая, Kalmytskaya) is a breed of beef cattle of the former Soviet Union, now found in the Russian Federation, in Kazakhstan and in Tajikistan. It is believed to have originated in Dzungaria, and to have been brought into south-eastern Russia by migrating Kalmyks in the seventeenth century.

== History ==
It is believed that the Kalmyk originated in Dzungaria, and was brought into south-eastern Russia by migrating Kalmyks in the seventeenth century.

In 1980 the total population of the breed in the Soviet Union was estimated at 381000, of which 217000 were purebred. In 2023 the Kalmyk was reported to DAD-IS by the Russian Federation, and by Kazakhstan and Tajikistan; no population data was reported, and the conservation status of the breed in those countries was 'unknown'.

== Characteristics ==
The Kalmyk is compact and of medium size: the average bodyweight for cows is 430 kg, for bulls 720 kg; average heights are 126 cm and 135 cm respectively. The coat is red, in varying shades, with white markings to the head, belly, and legs. The head is small, with a long face and short horns.
