= Yakut (name) =

Yakut of Yaqut (Arabic: ياقوت, romanized: Yāqūt), sometimes transliterated Yāḳūt or Yācūt, is the Arabic word for ruby. As a personal name, it may refer to:

== Given name ==
- Yakut Khan (before 1672-1733), Indian general who invaded Bombay in 1689
- Yaqut al-Hamawi (1179-1229), a Baghdadi former slave of Byzantine Greek ancestry turned Muslim ethnographer & geographer
- Yaqut al-Musta'simi (died 1298), calligrapher and secretary of the last Abbasid caliph

== Surname ==
- Jamal-ud-Din Yaqut (before 1200-1240), Abyssinian slave, close adviser & alleged lover of Razia Sultana, first female monarch of Delhi Sultanate of India
- Mehmet Vasıf Yakut, Turkish Para Taekwondo practitioner
- Narin Yakut (born 2004), Turkish women's footballer
- Şahin Yakut (1979-), Turkish kickboxer
