= Lago del Turano =

Lake in Italy

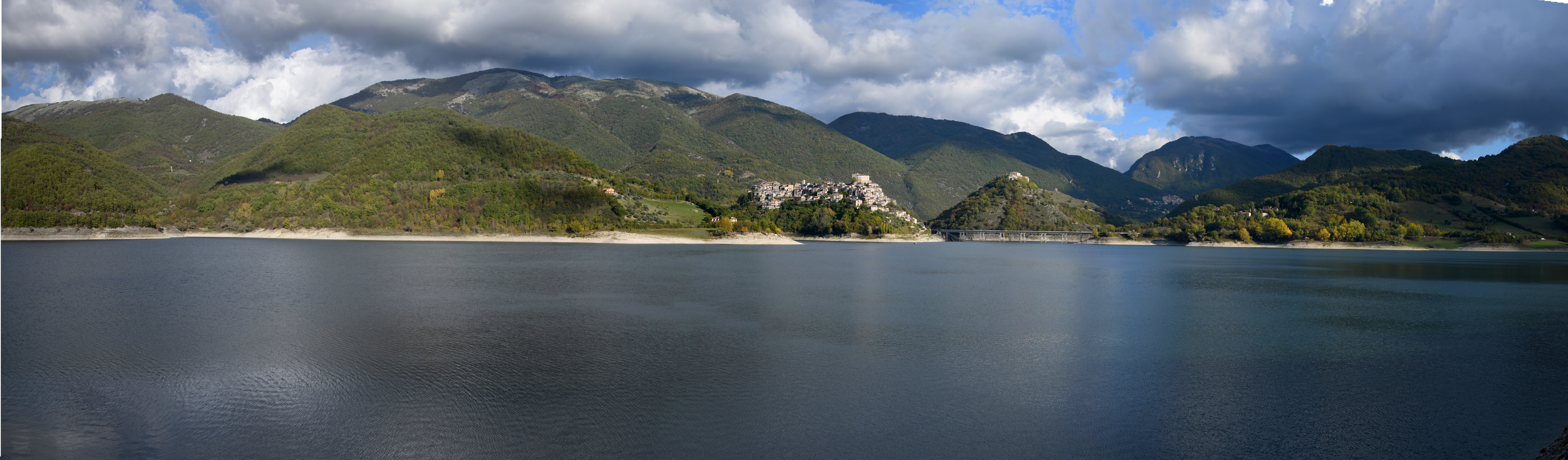

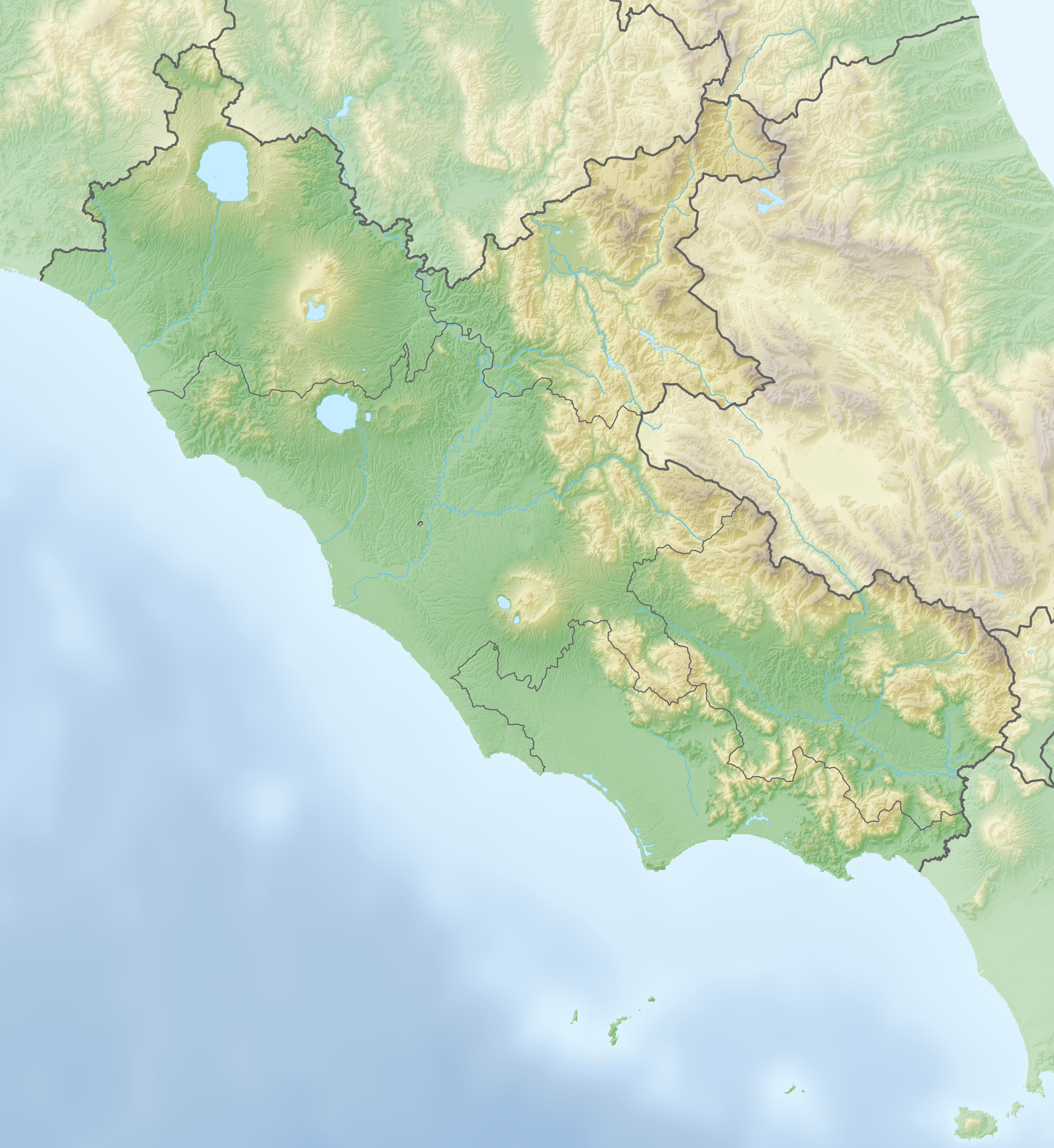
- Location within Lazio
- Location: Province of Rieti, Lazio
- Coordinates: 42.210978°N 12.956571°E
- Primary inflows: Turano River
- Primary outflows: Turano River
- Basin countries: Italy
- Surface area: 5.6 km^{2} (2.2 sq mi)
- Surface elevation: 536 m (1,759 ft)

Lago del Turano is a lake in the Province of Rieti, Lazio, Italy. At an elevation of 536 m, its surface area is 5.6 km^{2}.

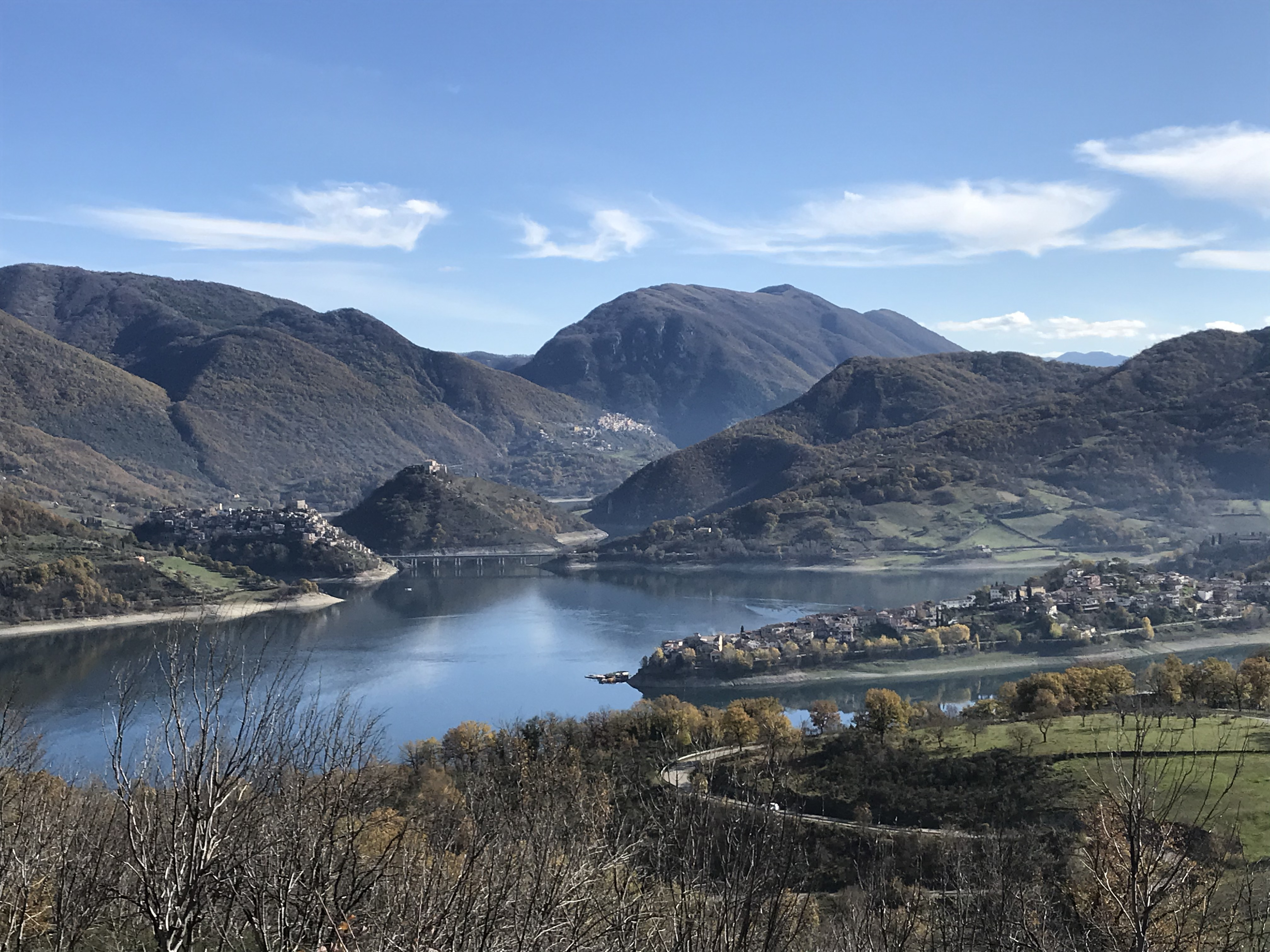
View of Turano Lake
