= 2023–24 V.League Division 1 Men's =

Japanese volleyball league

- League: V.League Division 1
- Sport: Volleyball
- Duration: 14 October 2023 – 31 March 2024
- Games: 187
- Teams: 10
- TV partner(s): V.TV by Easy sports Gaora Sports; Fuji TV

Regular round

Final stage
- Champions: Suntory Sunbirds
- Runners-up: Panasonic Panthers

Men's V.League Division 1 seasons
- ← 2022–23 2024–25 →

The 2023–24 V.League Division 1 Men's was the 30th tournament of the V.League between 14 October 2023 and 31 March 2024.

Voreas Hokkaido is promoted to V.League Division 1 after winning the 2022–23 V.League Division 2.

== Club ==
=== Personnel ===
2023–24 V.League Division 1 Men's
Club	Head coach	Captain	Province/City	Colors	Main Sponsor
Wolfdogs Nagoya	(Italy) Valerio Baldovin	(Poland) Bartosz Kurek	Inazawa, Aichi		Toyoda Gosei
Suntory Sunbirds	(Japan) Kota Yamamura	(Japan) Masaki Oya	Minoh, Osaka		Suntory
Panasonic Panthers	(France) Laurent Tillie	(Japan) Akihiro Yamauchi	Hirakata, Osaka		Panasonic
Toray Arrows	(Japan) Ayumu Shinoda	(Japan) Yudai Minemura	Mishima, Shizuoka		Toray Industries
Nippon Steel Sakai Blazers	(Japan) Shinya Chiba	(Japan) Dekita Takashi	Sakai, Osaka		Nippon Steel & Sumitomo Metal
JTEKT Stings	(Poland) Michał Gogol	(Japan) Ryuta Homma	Kariya, Aichi		JTEKT
JT Thunders Hiroshima	(Argentina) Raúl Lozano	(Japan) Shinichiro Inoue	Hiroshima, Hiroshima		Japan Tobacco
Tokyo Greatbears	(Finland) Kasper Vuorinen	(Japan) Koga Taichiro	Sumida, Tokyo		NatureLab Tokyo
VC Nagano Tridents	(Japan) Shinji Kawamura	(Japan) Kohta Ikeda	Takamori, Nagano		Melco Holdings INC.
Voreas Hokkaido	(Croatia) Edo Klein		Asahikawa, Hokkaido		Voreas, INC.

=== Transfer players ===
The list of transfer players in the 2023–24 season
Player	Moving from	Moving to	Ref.
Japanese players
(Japan) Yuma Nagatomo	(Japan) Tokyo Great Bears	(Japan) Fragolad Kagoshima	
(Japan) Issei Maeda	(Japan) Wolfdogs Nagoya	(Japan) JT Thunders Hiroshima	
(Japan) Taishi Onodera	(Japan) JT Thunders Hiroshima	(Japan) Suntory Sunbirds	
(Japan) Akihiro Fukatsu	(Japan) Nippon Steel Sakai Blazers	(Japan) Tokyo Great Bears	
(Japan) Shohei Nose	(Japan) Tokyo Great Bears	(Germany) SWD Powervolleys Düren	
(Japan) Wataru Taniguchi	(Japan) Tokyo Great Bears	(Italy) Pallavolo Padova	
(Japan) Shunsuke Watanabe	(Romania) Dinamo București	(Japan) Toray Arrows	
(Japan) Ryu Yamamoto	(Japan) Suntory Sunbirds	(Romania) Dinamo București	
(Japan) Masahiro Yanagida	(Japan) JTEKT Stings	(Japan) Tokyo Great Bears	
(Japan) Cole Hogland	(United States) Hawaii Rainbow Warriors	(Japan) Nippon Steel Sakai Blazers	
(Japan) Dai Tezuka	(Japan) Toray Arrows	(Japan) JTEKT Stings	
(Japan) Yuji Nishida	(Japan) JTEKT Stings	(Japan) Panasonic Panthers	
(Japan) Tomohiro Yamamoto	(Japan) Nippon Steel Sakai Blazers	(Japan) Panasonic Panthers	
(Japan) Shohei Ono	(Japan) Oita Miyoshi Weisse Adler	(Japan) VC Nagano Tridents	
(Japan) Shota Fujiwara	(Japan) Oita Miyoshi Weisse Adler	(Japan) VC Nagano Tridents	
(Japan) Kosuke Hata	(Japan) Suntory Sunbirds	(Japan) JTEKT Stings	
(Japan) Takahiko Imamura	(Japan) Panasonic Panthers	(Czech Republic) Kladno volejbal cz	
(Japan) Hiromasa Miwa	(Japan) VC Nagano Tridents	(Japan) JT Thunders Hiroshima	
(Japan) Kenta Koga	(Japan) Oita Miyoshi Weisse Adler	(Japan) Voreas Hokkaido	
(Japan) Kandai Goto (Note: For season 2023–24 only)	(Japan) Biwako Seikei Sport College	(Japan) Tokyo Great Bears	
(Japan) Kenshi Morisaki	(Japan) VC Nagano Tridents	(Japan) Reve's Tochigi	
(Japan) Ito Tatsuki	(Japan) VC Nagano Tridents	(Japan) Hokkaido Yellow Stars	
(Japan) Kota Yamada	(Japan) Oita Miyoshi Weisse Adler	(Japan) Hokkaido Yellow Stars	
(Japan) Hirohito Kashimura	(Japan) Voreas Hokkaido	(Japan) Suntory Sunbirds	
(Japan) Kouhei Yanagisawa	(Japan) JTEKT Stings	(Thailand) Diamond Food VC	
(Japan) Koki Yonemura	(Japan) Hokkaido Yellow Stars	(Japan) Voreas Hokkaido	
Foreign players
(China) Rao Shuhan	(China) Shanghai Bright	(Japan) JTEKT Stings	
(United States) Thomas Jaeschke	(Turkey) Halkbank Ankara	(Japan) Panasonic Panthers	
(China) Xiu Chengcheng	(China) Shanghai Bright	(Japan) VC Nagano Tridents	
(China) Xu Ke	(China) Bao Ding	(Japan) Toray Arrows	
(Poland) Michał Kubiak	(Japan) Panasonic Panthers	(China) Shanghai Bright	
(China) Yu Yuantai	(Qatar) Al Arabi	(Japan) Suntory Sunbirds	
(Cuba) Carlos Alberto Araujo	(Japan) VC Nagano Tridents	(Greece) Enosis Anagennisi Deryneias	
(Australia) Trent O'Dea	(Australia) Canberra Heat	(Japan) VC Nagano Tridents	

=== Foreign players ===
The total number of foreign players is restricted to one per club. Player from Asian Volleyball Confederation (AVC) nations are exempt from these restrictions.

The list of 2023–24 V.League Division 1 Men's Foreign Players
Club	Player	From AVC
Suntory Sunbirds	(Russia) Dmitry Muserskiy (CEV)	(China) Yu Yuantai
Wolfdogs Nagoya	(Poland) Bartosz Kurek (CEV)	(China) Wang Dongchen
Panasonic Panthers	(United States) Thomas Jaeschke (NORCECA)	none
Toray Arrows	(Hungary) Krisztián Pádár (CEV)	(China) Xu Ke
Nippon Steel Sakai Blazers	(Canada) Sharone Vernon-Evans (NORCECA)	none
JT Thunders Hiroshima	(United States) Aaron Russell (NORCECA)	(China) Jiang Chuan
JTEKT Stings	(Slovenia) Tine Urnaut (CEV)	(China) Rao Shuhan
Tokyo Greatbears	(Brazil) Rafael Araújo (CSV)	none
VC Nagano Tridents	(Australia) Trent O'Dea	(China) Xiu Chengcheng
Voreas Hokkaido	none	(Chinese Taipei) Chang Yu-sheng

=== Informal players ===
An informal player is a player still in high school or university but given a contract. Informal players are formally registered in V.League Organization and able to play on court.

The list of 2022–23 V.League Division 1 Men's Informal players
Players	From High schools/Universities	To Club	Ref.

== Competition format ==
The competition format was approved and released to the public.

=== Regular round ===
1. 10 teams participate in round robin system, playing each other team 4 times.
2. Teams are ranked in the Regular Round by:
  - Winning percentages ->Points ->Set Percentage ->Scoring Rate
3. The top six teams from the Regular Round will advance to the Final Stage
4. Ranking of 7th to 10th place ranking of the Regular Round is the final ranking.
5. As 2024–25 season will be reformed into S-V League, so there will be no relegation in this season.

=== Final stage ===
1. Top 6 teams of Regular Round to complete in a tournament format.
2. The teams ranked 3rd to 6th in the regular round will advance to the quarterfinals. The winner of the Quarterfinals advances to the Semifinals and the loser advances to the 5th place match.
3. The top two teams from the regular round and the winner of the quarterfinals will advance to the semifinals. The semi-final winner advances to the final, and the loser advances to the third-place match.
4. All matches will be 5-set matches.

== Season standing procedure ==
1. The teams will be ranked by the winning percentages
2. The teams will be ranked by the most point gained per match as follows:
  - Match won 3–0 or 3–1: 3 points for the winner, 0 points for the loser
  - Match won 3–2: 2 points for the winner, 1 point for the loser
  - Match forfeited: 3 points for the winner, 0 points (0–25, 0–25, 0–25) for the loser
3. If teams are still tied after examining the number of victories and points gained, then the FIVB will examine the results in order to break the tie in the following order:
  - Set quotient: if two or more teams are tied on total number of victories, they will be ranked by the quotient resulting from the division of the number of all set won by the number of all sets lost.
  - Points quotient: if the tie persists based on the set quotient, the teams will be ranked by the quotient resulting from the division of all points scored by the total of points lost during all sets.
  - If the tie persists based on the point quotient, the tie will be broken based on the team that won the match of the Round Robin Phase between the tied teams. When the tie in point quotient is between three or more teams, these teams ranked taking into consideration only the matches involving the teams in question.

== Regular round ==
=== Regular round standing ===
Pos	Team	Pld	W	L	Pts	SW	SL	SR	SPW	SPL	SPR	Qualification or relegation
1	Suntory Sunbirds	12	11	1	32	34	10	3.400	360	347	1.037	Qualified for the Semi-finals
2	JT Thunders Hiroshima	12	10	2	28	31	15	2.067	160	165	0.970	Qualified for the Semi-finals
3	Panasonic Panthers	10	9	1	27	27	6	4.500	154	127	1.213	Qualified for the Quarterfinals
4	Wolfdogs Nagoya	12	9	3	27	30	14	2.143	142	134	1.060	Qualified for the Quarterfinals
5	Nippon Steel Sakai Blazers	12	6	6	18	21	21	1.000	355	318	1.116	Qualified for the Quarterfinals
6	Tokyo Greatbears	12	5	7	17	22	23	0.957	314	349	0.900	Qualified for the Quarterfinals
7	Toray Arrows	12	4	8	11	19	29	0.655	349	333	1.048	
8	JTEKT Stings	10	3	7	9	13	23	0.565	134	142	0.944	
9	Voreas Hokkaido	12	1	11	3	7	33	0.212	159	194	0.820	Relegation
10	VC Nagano Tridents	12	0	12	2	6	36	0.167	163	181	0.901	Relegation

Source: 2023–24 V.LEAGUE DIVISION1 MEN V・レギュラーラウンド

=== Results table ===
TBA

=== Match results ===
- All times are Japan Standard Time (UTC+09:00).

==== Matchday 1 ====
14 October 2023; 12:10	Nippon Steel Sakai Blazers	3-1	Toray Arrows	Ohama Daishin Arena; Attendance: 1,774; Referees: Shin Muranaka, Tomohito Shiro
14 October 2023; 12:10	25-22, 20-25, 29-27, 25-23; Report Statistics			Ohama Daishin Arena; Attendance: 1,774; Referees: Shin Muranaka, Tomohito Shiro

14 October 2023; 14:05	Suntory Sunbirds	3-1	Tokyo Greatbears	Daiichi Sports Complex; Attendance: 1,032; Referees: Taisuke Togawa, Seiji Kiuchi
14 October 2023; 14:05	16-25, 25-19, 25-22, 25-17; Report Statistics			Daiichi Sports Complex; Attendance: 1,032; Referees: Taisuke Togawa, Seiji Kiuchi

15 October 2023; 12:00	Nippon Steel Sakai Blazers	3-0	Toray Arrows	Ohama Daishin Arena; Attendance: 1,737; Referees: Junichi Hayashi, Shin Muranaka
15 October 2023; 12:00	25-19, 25-21, 25-18; Report Statistics			Ohama Daishin Arena; Attendance: 1,737; Referees: Junichi Hayashi, Shin Muranaka

15 October 2023; 13:35	Suntory Sunbirds	3-2	Tokyo Greatbears	Daiichi Sports Complex; Attendance: 968; Referees: Hiroyuki Hara, Taisuke Togawa
15 October 2023; 13:35	18-25, 25-23, 25-18, 21-25, 15-13; Report Statistics			Daiichi Sports Complex; Attendance: 968; Referees: Hiroyuki Hara, Taisuke Togawa

==== Matchday 2 ====
21 October 2023; 13:00	Wolfdogs Nagoya	3-0	JTEKT Stings	Toyoda Gosei Memorial Gymnasium; Attendance: 2,018; Referees: Yutaka Moriguchi, Hiroyuki Hara
21 October 2023; 13:00	25-20, 25-22, 25-17; Report Statistics			Toyoda Gosei Memorial Gymnasium; Attendance: 2,018; Referees: Yutaka Moriguchi, Hiroyuki Hara

21 October 2023; 13:00	JT Thunders Hiroshima	3-1	Suntory Sunbirds	FPCO Arena Fukuyama; Attendance: 1,280; Referees: Shingo Yamamoto, Akira Honma
21 October 2023; 13:00	25-23, 25-23, 20-25, 25-19; Report Statistics			FPCO Arena Fukuyama; Attendance: 1,280; Referees: Shingo Yamamoto, Akira Honma

21 October 2023; 14:00	Toray Arrows	3-1	Voreas Hokkaido	Mishima Citizen Gymnasium; Attendance: 1,080; Referees: Tomohito Shiro, Taisuke Togawa
21 October 2023; 14:00	25-13, 25-16, 23-25, 25-16; Report Statistics			Mishima Citizen Gymnasium; Attendance: 1,080; Referees: Tomohito Shiro, Taisuke Togawa

21 October 2023; 14:00	VC Nagano Tridents	2-3	Nippon Steel Sakai Blazers	Matsumoto City Gymnasium; Attendance: 981; Referees: Hiroaki Takahashi, Hajime Sawada
21 October 2023; 14:00	17-25, 25-18, 22-25, 25-22, 14-16; Report Statistics			Matsumoto City Gymnasium; Attendance: 981; Referees: Hiroaki Takahashi, Hajime Sawada

21 October 2023; 15:05	Tokyo Greatbears	0-3	Panasonic Panthers	Yoyogi National Gymnasium; Attendance: 2,783; Referees: Takashi Masaoka, Yui Asai
21 October 2023; 15:05	22-25, 19-25, 17-25; Report Statistics			Yoyogi National Gymnasium; Attendance: 2,783; Referees: Takashi Masaoka, Yui Asai

22 October 2023; 13:00	Wolfdogs Nagoya	0-3	JTEKT Stings	Toyoda Gosei Memorial Gymnasium; Attendance: 2,271; Referees: Hiroyuki Hara, Tomohiro Kurukawa
22 October 2023; 13:00	22-25, 23-25, 22-25; Report Statistics			Toyoda Gosei Memorial Gymnasium; Attendance: 2,271; Referees: Hiroyuki Hara, Tomohiro Kurukawa

22 October 2023; 13:00	VC Nagano Tridents	0-3	Nippon Steel Sakai Blazers	Matsumoto City Gymnasium; Attendance: 940; Referees: Tatsuhiro Sawa, Hiroaki Takahashi
22 October 2023; 13:00	18-25, 23-25, 19-25; Report Statistics			Matsumoto City Gymnasium; Attendance: 940; Referees: Tatsuhiro Sawa, Hiroaki Takahashi

22 October 2023; 13:00	JT Thunders Hiroshima	0-3	Suntory Sunbirds	FPCO Arena Fukuyama; Attendance: 1,625; Referees: Akira Honma, Yasuo Chiyonobu
22 October 2023; 13:00	22-25, 23-25, 20-25; Report Statistics			FPCO Arena Fukuyama; Attendance: 1,625; Referees: Akira Honma, Yasuo Chiyonobu

22 October 2023; 14:00	Toray Arrows	3-1	Voreas Hokkaido	Mishima Citizen Gymnasium; Attendance: 1,211; Referees: Taisuke Togawa, Tsuyoshi Komatsu
22 October 2023; 14:00	25-22, 25-20, 21-25, 25-22; Report Statistics			Mishima Citizen Gymnasium; Attendance: 1,211; Referees: Taisuke Togawa, Tsuyoshi Komatsu

22 October 2023; 15:05	Tokyo Greatbears	0-3	Panasonic Panthers	Yoyogi National Gymnasium; Attendance: 2,745; Referees: Yui Asai, Hiroyuki Nitta
22 October 2023; 15:05	27-29, 21-25, 21-25; Report Statistics			Yoyogi National Gymnasium; Attendance: 2,745; Referees: Yui Asai, Hiroyuki Nitta

== Final stage ==
Quarterfinals
Date
3
6
Date
4
5

Semifinals
Date
1
Date
2

Final
Date
3rd place match
Date

5th place match
Date

=== Quarterfinals ===
v

v

=== 5th place match ===
v

=== Semifinals ===
v

v

=== 3rd place match ===
v

=== Final ===
v

== Final standing ==
Rank	Team
1st place, gold medalist(s)	Suntory Sunbirds
2nd place, silver medalist(s)	Panasonic Panthers
3rd place, bronze medalist(s)	Toray Arrows
4	JT Thunders
5	Wolfdogs Nagoya
6	Osaka Blazers Sakai
7	Tokyo Great Bears
8	JTEKT Stings
9	Voreas Hokkaido
10	VC Nagano Tridents

Qualified for the 2025 Asian Club Championship

== Awards ==
=== Individual awards (technical performance) ===
- Best scorer
- Best spiker
- Best blocker
- Best server
- Best receiver

=== V.League Honour award ===
The award was distributed to players who participate in 10 seasons or more, 230 games or more.

=== Final stage ===
- Most valuable player
- Fighting spirit award
- Best Six
- Best libero
- Receive award
- Best newcomer award
- Best coach award
- Matsudaira Yasutaka award
