= Shinji Takahashi (volleyball) =

Japanese volleyball player (born 1980)

Personal information
- Nationality: Japanese
- Born: 16 July 1980 (age 46); Matsuyama, Ehime, Japan
- Hometown: Tokyo, Japan
- Height: 182 cm (6 ft 0 in)
- Weight: 75 kg (165 lb)
- Spike: 315 cm (124 in)
- Block: 305 cm (120 in)

Coaching information
Previous teams coached
Years	Teams
2018–2021	(Japan) JTEKT Stings

Volleyball information
- Position: Setter

Career
Years	Teams
2006–2009	(Japan) Blue Rockets Tokyo
2009–2018	(Japan) JTEKT Stings

National team
2014, 2016	Japan

Shinji Takahashi (髙橋 慎治, Takahashi Shinji; born 16 July 1980) is a retired Japanese male volleyball player and was part of the Japan men's national volleyball team. He started to be the head coach for JTEKT Stings in V.League Division 1 since 2018–19 season until 2020–21 season. He led the team won the first V.League 1 title of the club's history in 2020 and the Emperor's Cup title in 2021. Currently, he is being a management staff of the team.

== Awards ==
=== Personal ===
- 2019–20 V.League 1 — Yasutaka Matsudaira Award (松平康隆賞), given to the coach of the championship team, with JTEKT Stings
- 2019–20 V.League 1 — Director Award, with JTEKT Stings

=== Coaching club teams ===
- 2019–20 V.League 1 — Champion, with JTEKT Stings
- 2020–21 Japanese Emperor's Cup — Champion, with JTEKT Stings

== Personal life ==
His younger brother, Kozo Takahashi, was also a part of Japan men's national volleyball team and he already retired.
