= Go Murayama =

Japanese volleyball player (born 1998)

Personal information
- Full name: 村山 豪
- Nationality: Japanese
- Born: July 30, 1998 (age 28) Nerima, Tokyo
- Education: Waseda University
- Height: 192 cm (6 ft 4 in)
- Weight: 83 kg (183 lb)

Volleyball information
- Position: Middle blocker
- Current club: Tokyo Great Bears
- Number: National Team #16; Club #12

Career
- Years: Team
- 2020–Present: (Japan) JTEKT Stings

National team
- Years: Team
- 2022–Present: Japan national team
Honours
Men's volleyball
Representing Japan
- Updated on May 3, 2023

Go Murayama (村山 豪, Go Murayama; born 30 July 1998) is a Japanese volleyball player who plays for Tokyo Great Bears in V.League Division 1. He also is a member of Japan men's national volleyball team.

== Career ==
In college, he and his classmate Kento Miyaura won four consecutive Japan intercollegiate championships. Go Murayama joined his first club team JTEKT Stings in 2020. He was first called to Japan men's national volleyball team in 2022.

Murayama had been feeling pain in his knee since April and underwent surgery after consulting with the training staff and doctors in 2023.

== Award ==
=== Club ===
- 2020: Emperor's Cup — Champion, with JTEKT Stings
- 2022: Emperor's Cup — Champion, with JTEKT Stings

=== Individual awards ===
- 2019: Asian U23 Championship - Best Middle blocker
- 2022: V.League Division 1 - Best Rookie award

== Personal life ==
Go Murayama's father is African and his mother is Japanese.
