= Sagamihara-Yaei High School =

Coordinates: 35°33′20.3″N 139°23′15.8″E

Sagamihara Yaei High School (神奈川県立相模原弥栄高等学校)
- Sagamihara, Kanagawa; Japan

Information
- Type: Prefectural Senior Co-educational
- Established: 1983 (as Yaei East and West)
- Grades: 1st-3rd years Senior High School; U.S. grades 10-12
- Colours: Blue and white
- Website: pen-kanagawa.ed.jp/sagamiharayaei-h/
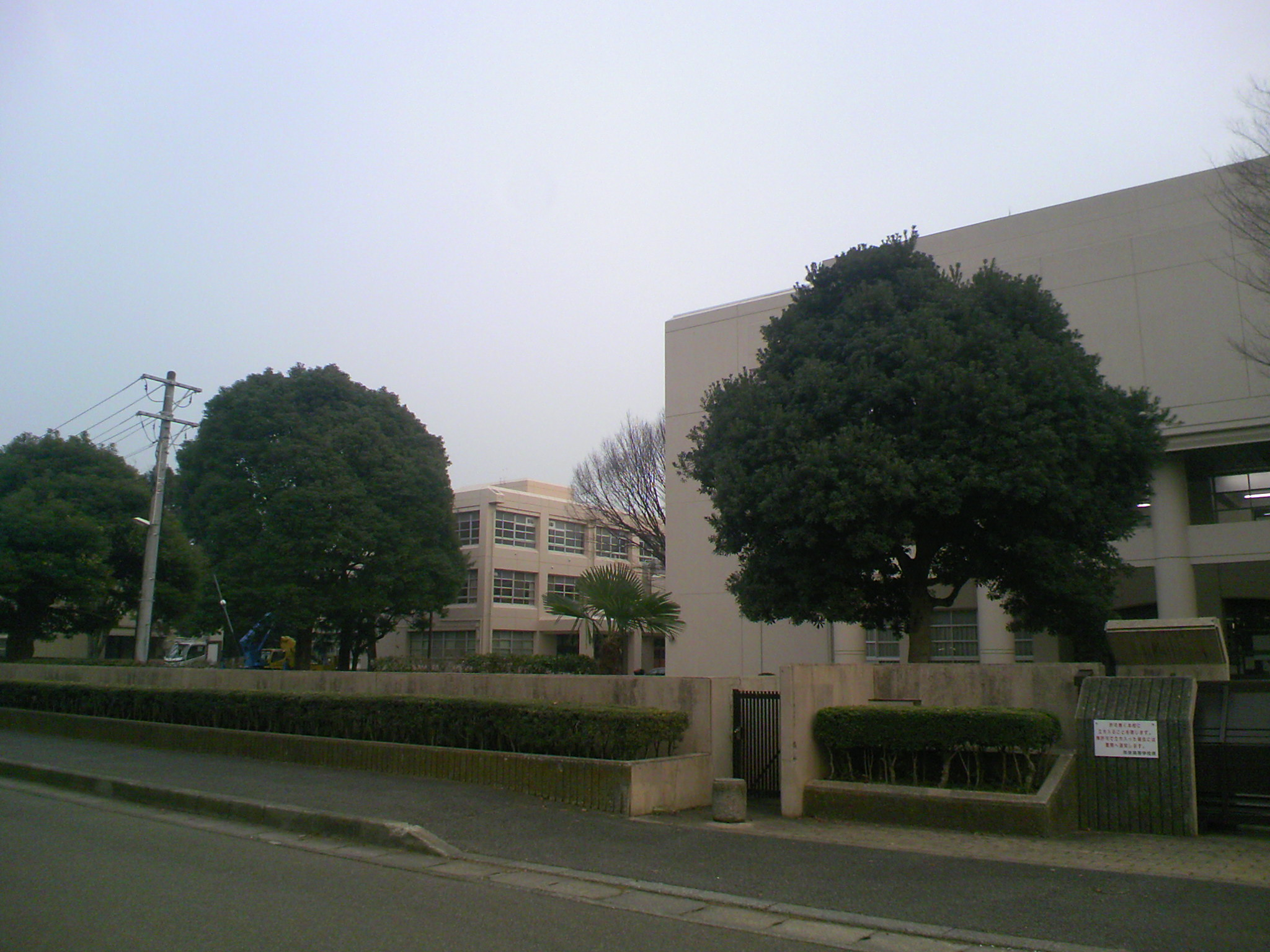

Kanagawa Prefectural Sagamihara Yaei High School (神奈川県立相模原弥栄高等学校, Kanagawa Kenritsu Sagamihara Yaei Kōtōgakkō) is a high school located in Sagamihara, Kanagawa Prefecture, Japan. Founded in 1983 as Yaei East (弥栄東) and Yaei West (弥栄西), the two schools merged in 2008. They were merged as part of the "Kanagawa 100 New High Schools" plan.

== Yaei East and West ==
Yaei High School was established in 1983 as two separate schools: Yaei East, and Yaei West High School. At the time, they were known as "Twin Schools". The schools were located on the same campus, and both used the same sports ground, library and other facilities. However, the schools were different as they had classrooms on separate ends of the campus, staff and administration were separated and they both had their own gymnasium. Both schools shared very similar uniforms and emblems and both offered a general course of study to their students however, Yaei West specialized in Physical Education and Foreign Languages, while Yaei East specialised in Music and Arts. Both schools were co-educational and had enrollments over 500.

Also known as A.S.I.S., Yaei High School (神奈川県立弥栄高等学校) was formed in 2008. The new school specializes in four areas: Arts, Sports Science, International studies and Science and Maths, hence why the school is informally known as A.S.I.S. Since the merger, academic standards rose dramatically and Yaei High School has become one of the top schools in Sagamihara. The uniform has slightly changed from the former Yaei East and West uniforms, but remains very much the same design.

Seiryo High School merged into Yaei High in 2020, and Yaei is now known as Sagamihara-Yaei High School.

== Location ==
Yaei High School is about 15 minutes walk from Fuchinobe Station located on the Yokohama Line. The school is also accessible using Kamimizo Station on the Sagami Line for those coming from the South. The school is located in the suburb of Yaei in Sagamihara, near the border of Tokyo and Kanagawa Prefectures. The school is also adjacent to Sagamihara Stadium and Fuchinobe Park.

== Notable alumni ==
- Ryuta Homma (Volleyball player for JTEKT Stings in V.League division 1 and used to be a part of Japan men's national volleyball team)
- Shinya Hagiuda (Soccer player for J-League side Mitsubishi Motors Mizushima F.C.)
- Yoohei Kawakami (Singer and guitarist for Alexandros)
- Yoshinobu Minowa (Soccer player for J-League side Kawasaki Frontale, former Japanese national player )
- Masaki Shirai (Guitarist for Alexandros)
- Yuji Yabu (Soccer player for J-League side Kawasaki Frontale)
