= 2019–20 V.League Division 1 Men =

2019–20 V.League Division 1 Men's
- League: V.League Division 1
- Sport: Volleyball
- Duration: October 26, 2019 – February 29, 2020
- Games: 135 (Regular round); 4 (Final stage)
- Teams: 10
- Total attendance: 216,564

2019–2020
- Season champions: JTEKT Stings
- Season MVP: (Japan) Yuji Nishida
- Top scorer: (Japan) Yuji Nishida
- Runners-up: Panasonic Panthers

Men's V.League Division 1 seasons
- 2018–19 2020–21

The Volleyball 2019–20 V.League Division 1 Men's was the 26th tournament of the V.League and the highest level men's tournament in Japan, which was held from October 26, 2019 – February 29, 2020.

== Clubs ==
Locations of the 2019–20 V.League Division 1 Men's clubs

=== Personnel ===
2019–20 V.League Division 1 Men's Personnel
Club	Head coach	Captain	Province/City	Colors	Main Sponsor
Suntory Sunbirds	(Japan) Masaji Ogino	(Japan) Kentaro Hoshiya	Minoh, Osaka		Suntory
Panasonic Panthers	(Brazil) Mauricio Paes	(Japan) Hideomi Fukatsu	Hirakata, Osaka		Panasonic
Wolf Dogs Nagoya	(Finland) Tommi Tiilikainen	(Japan) Koichiro Koga	Inazawa		Toyoda Machine Works
JTEKT Stings	(Japan) Shinji Takahashi	(Japan) Ryuta Homma	Kariya, Aichi		JTEKT
Toray Arrows	(Japan) Shinoda Ayumu	(Japan) Hidetomo Hoshino	Mishima, Shizuoka		Toray Industries
JT Thunders	(Slovenia) Tine Sattler	(Japan) Shohei Yamamoto	Hiroshima, Hiroshima		Japan Tobacco
Osaka Blazers Sakai	(United States) Gordon Mayforth	(Japan) Naoya Takano	Sakai, Osaka		Nippon Steel & Sumitomo Metal
FC Tokyo	(Japan) Koichiro Shimbo	(Japan) Yuma Nagatomo	Sumida, Tokyo		Tokyo Gas
Oita Miyoshi Weisse Adler	(Japan) Takashi Ogawa	(Japan) Kouki Komeda	Oita, Oita		The Oita Bank Ltd.
VC Nagano Tridents	(Iran) Ahmad Masajedi	(Japan) Tsubasa Osada	Takamori, Nagano		Jermo Corporation Ltd.

=== Transfer players ===
The list of transfer players in the 2019–20 season
Player	Moving from	Moving to	Ref.
Japanese players
(Japan) Tatsuya Fukuzawa	(Japan) Panasonic Panthers	(France) Paris Volley	
(Japan) Shun Wanabe	(Japan) JTEKT Stings	(North Macedonia) Vardar Skopje	
(Japan) Yuki Hirose	(Japan) JTEKT Stings	(Japan) Tsukuba United Sun Gaia	
(Japan) Yamato Fushimi	(Japan) Toray Arrows	(Japan) JTEKT Stings	
(Japan) Shunsuke Watanabe	(Japan) Toray Arrows	(Germany) Heitec Volleys Eltmann	
(Japan) Masato Kubota	(Japan) Daido Steel Red Star	(Japan) Oita Miyoshi Weisse Adler	
(Japan) Shintaro Tajiri	(Japan) Tokyo Verdy	(Japan) Oita Miyoshi Weisse Adler	
Foreign players
(China) Ji Daoshuai	(China) Shandong Volleyball	(Japan) Suntory Sunbirds	
(Chinese Taipei) Chien-Chen Chen	(Japan) Panasonic Panthers	(Japan) JT Thunders	
(Chinese Taipei) Hung-Min Liu	(Thailand) Diamond Food Saraburi	(Japan) Panasonic Panthers	
(Bulgaria) Valentin Bratoev	(Japan) JTEKT Stings	(Qatar) Al Arabi S.C	
(China) Zhen Qin	(Japan) JTEKT Stings	(China) Shanghai Golden Age	
(China) Shuhan Rao	(China) Shanghai Golden Age	(Japan) JTEKT Stings	
(Bulgaria) Matey Kaziyski	(Italy) NBV Verona	(Japan) JTEKT Stings	
(Croatia) Igor Omrčen	(Japan) Wolf Dogs Nagoya	(Croatia) OK Split	
(Chinese Taipei) Hong-Jie Liu	(Thailand) Diamond Food Saraburi	(Japan) Wolf Dogs Nagoya	
(Slovenia) Mitja Gasparini	(South Korea) Incheon Korean Air Jumbos	(China) Wolf Dogs Nagoya	
(North Macedonia) Nikola Gjorgiev	(Japan) Osaka Blazers Sakai	(Germany) VfB Friedrichshafen	
(Puerto Rico) Maurice Torres	(Puerto Rico) Mets de Guaynabo	(Japan) Osaka Blazers Sakai	
(China) Liu Libin	(Japan) JT Thunders	(China) Beijing BAIC Motor	
(Canada) Jason DeRocco	(Japan) FC Tokyo	(Iran) Al Ahly SC	
(Serbia) Petar Premović	(Italy) Kioene Padova	(Japan) FC Tokyo	
(Russia) Artem Kiselev	(Japan) VC Nagano Tridents	(Russia) Gazprom-Ugra Surgut	
(Poland) Patryk Strzeżek	(Belgium) Lindemans Aalst	(Japan) VC Nagano Tridents	
(Philippines) Marck Espejo	(Japan) Oita Miyoshi Weisse Adler	(Thailand) Visakha	
(Philippines) Bryan Bagunas	(Philippines) Philippine Air Force	(Japan) Oita Miyoshi Weisse Adler	
(Rwanda) Yves Mutabazi (Note: Withdrew due to the injury, replaced by Yakan Guma)	(Turkey) Niksar Belediyesi	(Japan) Oita Miyoshi Weisse Adler	

=== Foreign players ===
The total number of foreign players is restricted to one per club. Player from Asian Volleyball Confederation (AVC) nations are exempt from these restrictions.

The list of 2019–20 V.League Division 1 Men's Foreign Players
Club	Player	From AVC
Suntory Sunbirds	(Russia) Dmitry Muserskiy (CEV)	(China) Ji Daoshuai
Panasonic Panthers	(Poland) Michał Kubiak (CEV)	(Chinese Taipei) Hung-Min Liu
Wolf Dogs Nagoya	(Slovenia) Mitja Gasparini (CEV)	(Taiwan) Hong-Jie Liu
JTEKT Stings	(Bulgaria) Matey Kaziyski (CEV)	(China) Rao Shuhan
Toray Arrows	(France) Antonin Rouzier (CEV)	(Myanmar) Aung Thu
JT Thunders	–	(Chinese Taipei) Chien-Chen Chen (Australia) Thomas Edgar
Osaka Blazers Sakai	(Puerto Rico) Maurice Torres (NORCECA)	–
FC Tokyo	(Serbia) Petar Premović (CEV)	–
VC Nagano Tridents	(Poland) Patryk Strzeżek (CEV)	–
Oita Miyoshi Weisse Adler	(Rwanda) Yakan Guma (CAVB)	(Philippines) Bryan Bagunas

=== Withdrawn and retired players ===
The list of withdrawn and retired players that officially announced the withdrawal or retirement since April 2019 to February 2020.

The list of withdrawn and retired players in the 2019–20 season
Date	Player	2019–20 Club	Note	Ref.
7 May 2019	Yuta Abe	Toray Arrows	Retired from being Player-coach. Transferred to full time coach assistant.	
31 May 2019	Tatsuya Yoneyama	Suntory Sunbirds	Retired	
31 May 2019	HIdeaki Okamoto	Wolf Dogs Nagoya	Retired	
3 June 2019	Masayuki Ikeda	Panasonic Panthers	Retired	
5 June 2019	Shinichi Seino	JTEKT Stings	Retired	
5 June 2019	Kosuke Matsubara	JTEKT Stings	Retired	
3 July 2019	Shohei Nose	FC Tokyo	Withdrew, due to the injury	
19 July 2019	Naoto Tomita	FC Tokyo	Withdrew, due to the injury	
13 September 2019	Yuma Nagamoto	FC Tokyo	Withdrew, due to the injury	
2 December 2019	Hiroki Fujita	Oita Miyoshi Weisse Adler	Withdrew	
6 January 2020	Tomoya Tsujiguchi	Oita Miyoshi Weisse Adler	Withdrew	
20 February 2020	Tomoya Tsujiguchi	Oita Miyoshi Weisse Adler	Retired	
20 February 2020	Hiroki Fujita	Oita Miyoshi Weisse Adler	Retired	

=== Informal players ===
An informal player is a trainee who came in the team and has not registered as V.League player yet. Mostly, the player still is in the last year of university or high school.

The list of Japanese informal players in the 2019–20 season
Club	Player	University / High school	Ref.
Suntory Sunbirds	Hiroki Nishida	Hosei University	
Suntory Sunbirds	Yuito Takahashi	University of Tsukuba	
Suntory Sunbirds	Tatsuki Kashiwada	Senshu University	
Toray Arrows	Shoma Tomita	Chuo University	
Toray Arrows	Hiroki Ozawa	University of Tsukuba	
Toray Arrows	Takumi Yamaguchi	University of Tsukuba	
Osaka Blazers Sakai	Tomohiro Horie	Waseda University	
FC Tokyo	Tetsuya Muto	Waseda University	
FC Tokyo	Koga Matsuda	Fukuoka University	
VC Nagano Tridents	Ryusuke Nakamura	Juntendo University	
VC Nagano Tridents	Tatsuki Ito	Tokai University	
VC Nagano Tridents	Yudai Kawahigashi	Nippon Sport Science University	
VC Nagano Tridents	Taihei Hazama	University of Toyama	
VC Nagano Tridents	Masaya Kado	Juntendo University	

== Season standing procedure ==
1. The teams will be ranked by the total number of victories (matches won, matched lost)
2. In the event of a tie, the following first tiebreaker will apply: the most point gained per match as follows:
3. The teams will be ranked by the most point gained per match as follows:
  - Match won 3–0 or 3–1: 3 points for the winner, 0 points for the loser
  - Match won 3–2: 2 points for the winner, 1 point for the loser
  - Match forfeited: 3 points for the winner, 0 points (0–25, 0–25, 0–25) for the loser
4. If teams are still tied after examining the number of victories and points gained, then the FIVB will examine the results in order to break the tie in the following order:
  - Set quotient: if two or more teams are tied on total number of victories, they will be ranked by the quotient resulting from the division of the number of all set won by the number of all sets lost.
  - Points quotient: if the tie persists based on the set quotient, the teams will be ranked by the quotient resulting from the division of all points scored by the total of points lost during all sets.
  - If the tie persists based on the point quotient, the tie will be broken based on the team that won the match of the Round Robin Phase between the tied teams. When the tie in point quotient is between three or more teams, these teams ranked taking into consideration only the matches involving the teams in question.

== Regular Round ==
=== Standings ===
Pos	Team	Pld	W	L	Pts	SW	SL	SR	SPW	SPL	SPR	Qualification
1	Panasonic Panthers	27	24	3	70	73	21	3.476	2304	2023	1.139	Final Game
2	JTEKT Stings	27	23	4	65	71	29	2.448	2311	2061	1.121	Final Stage
3	JT Thunders	27	21	6	62	68	26	2.615	2219	1934	1.147	Final Stage
4	Suntory Sunbirds	27	18	9	55	60	35	1.714	2242	2071	1.083	Final Stage
5	Osaka Blazers Sakai	27	15	12	44	55	44	1.250	2250	2175	1.034	Final Stage
6	Toray Arrows	27	12	15	38	51	57	0.895	2361	2408	0.980	
7	Wolf Dogs Nagoya	27	10	17	32	46	57	0.807	2289	2320	0.987	
8	FC Tokyo	27	6	21	16	28	73	0.384	2117	2376	0.891	
9	Oita Miyoshi Weisse Adler	27	3	24	14	22	73	0.301	1924	2278	0.845	
10	VC Nagano Tridents	27	3	24	9	17	76	0.224	1878	2249	0.835	

Source: Ranking Table V.league Division 1 Men's 2019–20

=== Leg 1 ===
==== Week 1 ====
===== Stadium =====
Stadium 1	Stadium 2	Stadium 3
Shimabara	Nagoya	Matsumoto
Shimabara Reconstruction Arena	Takeda Teva Ocean Arena	Matsumoto City Gymnasium
Oita Miyoshi Weisse Adler; JT Thunders; Toray Arrows; Osaka Blazers Sakai	Wolf Dogs Nagoya; Suntory Sunbirds; JTEKT Stings; FC Tokyo	VC Nagano Tridents; Panasonic Panthers

===== Results =====
- All times are Japan Standard Time (UTC+09:00).

Date	Time		Score		Set 1	Set 2	Set 3	Set 4	Set 5	Total	Report
26 Oct	12:00	Toray Arrows	3–2	Osaka Blazers Sakai	16–25	26–24	25–18	22–25	15–12	104–104	Report Stats
26 Oct	13:05	Wolf Dogs Nagoya	0–3	Suntory Sunbirds	23–25	19–25	24–26			66–76	Report Stats
26 Oct	14:00	VC Nagano Tridents	0–3	Panasonic Panthers	23–25	17–25	19–25			59–75	Report Stats
26 Oct	15:20	Oita Miyoshi Weisse Adler	0–3	JT Thunders	20–25	19–25	18–25			57–75	Report Stats
26 Oct	15:30	JTEKT Stings	3–0	FC Tokyo	25–16	25–19	25–16			75–51	Report Stats
27 Oct	12:00	Wolf Dogs Nagoya	3–0	FC Tokyo	25–20	25–19	25–19			75–58	Report Stats
27 Oct	12:05	JT Thunders	3–0	Toray Arrows	25–20	25–19	25–21			75–60	Report Stats
27 Oct	14:30	Suntory Sunbirds	1–3	JTEKT Stings	25–23	23–25	21–25	26–28		95–101	Report Stats
27 Oct	15:00	Oita Miyoshi Weisse Adler	0–3	Osaka Blazers Sakai	23–25	24–26	18–25			65–76	Report Stats

==== Week 2 ====
===== Stadium =====
Stadium 1	Stadium 2	Stadium 3
Fukuyama	Fukui	Tajimi
Fukuyama City Midoricho Park Indoor Stadium	Fukui Prefectural Gymnasium	Tajimi City Gymnasium
JT Thunders; FC Tokyo; Suntory Sunbirds; Osaka Blazers Sakai	Panasonic Panthers; Toray Arrows; Oita Miyoshi Weisse Adler; VC Nagano Tridents	Wolf Dogs Nagoya; JTEKT Stings

===== Results =====
- All times are Japan Standard Time (UTC+09:00).

Date	Time		Score		Set 1	Set 2	Set 3	Set 4	Set 5	Total	Report
2 Nov	13:00	JT Thunders	3–0	FC Tokyo	25–17	25–15	25–20			75–52	Report Stats
2 Nov	13:05	Panasonic Panthers	3–1	Toray Arrows	25–22	21–25	25–20	31–29		102–96	Report Stats
2 Nov	14:00	Wolf Dogs Nagoya	0–3	JTEKT Stings	19–25	13–25	22–25			54–75	Report Stats
2 Nov	16:00	Suntory Sunbirds	3–1	Osaka Blazers Sakai	23–25	25–23	25–20	25–21		98–89	Report Stats
2 Nov	16:15	Oita Miyoshi Weisse Adler	3–0	VC Nagano Tridents	25–20	25–23	25–16			75–59	Report Stats
3 Nov	12:00	Panasonic Panthers	3–0	Oita Miyoshi Weisse Adler	25–20	25–21	25–16			75–57	Report Stats
3 Nov	13:00	Osaka Blazers Sakai	3–1	FC Tokyo	19–25	25–20	25–18	25–19		94–82	Report Stats
3 Nov	15:00	Toray Arrows	3–0	VC Nagano Tridents	25–16	25–12	25–22	25–20		100–70	Report Stats
3 Nov	16:05	JT Thunders	3–0	Suntory Sunbirds	25–19	25–14	26–24			76–57	Report Stats

==== Week 3 ====
===== Stadium =====
Stadium 1	Stadium 2	Stadium 3
Kitakyushu	Sumida	Ehime
Kitakyushu City General Gymnasium	Sumida City Gymnasium	Ehime Prefecture Budokan
Osaka Blazers Sakai; Wolf Dogs Nagoya; JT Thunders; JTEKT Stings	FC Tokyo; Panasonic Panthers; Suntory Sunbirds; VC Nagano Tridents	Toray Arrows; Oita Miyoshi Weisse Adler

===== Results =====
- All times are Japan Standard Time (UTC+09:00).

Date	Time		Score		Set 1	Set 2	Set 3	Set 4	Set 5	Total	Report
9 Nov	12:00	Osaka Blazers Sakai	1–3	Wolf Dogs Nagoya	23–25	22–25	25–22	24–26		94–98	Report Stats
9 Nov	13:00	FC Tokyo	1–3	Panasonic Panthers	21–25	25–23	18–25	24–26		88–99	Report Stats
9 Nov	15:00	Toray Arrows	3–0	Oita Miyoshi Weisse Adler	25–15	25–15	25–20			75–50	Report Stats
9 Nov	15:10	JT Thunders	1–3	JTEKT Stings	18–25	25–23	23–25	23–25		89–98	Report Stats
9 Nov	16:00	Suntory Sunbirds	3–0	VC Nagano Tridents	25–20	25–20	25–21			75–61	Report Stats
10 Nov	12:00	FC Tokyo	1–3	VC Nagano Tridents	22–25	24–26	25–21	24–26		95–98	Report Stats
10 Nov	12:00	Osaka Blazers Sakai	1–3	JTEKT Stings	25–23	21–25	21–25	18–25		85–98	Report Stats
10 Nov	15:00	Panasonic Panthers	1–3	Suntory Sunbirds	18–25	23–25	28–26	18–25		87–101	Report Stats
10 Nov	15:00	JT Thunders	3–1	Wolf Dogs Nagoya	25–23	27–25	21–25	25–22		98–95	Report Stats

==== Week 4 ====
===== Stadium =====
Stadium 1	Stadium 2	Stadium 3
Matsumoto	Shizuoka	Sendai
Matsumoto City Gymnasium	Konohana Arena	Kamei Arena Sendai
Panasonic Panthers; JT Thunders; VC Nagano Tridents; Osaka Blazers Sakai	Toray Arrows; Wolf Dogs Nagoya; JTEKT Stings; Oita Miyoshi Weisse Adler	Suntory Sunbirds; FC Tokyo

===== Results =====
- All times are Japan Standard Time (UTC+09:00).

Date	Time		Score		Set 1	Set 2	Set 3	Set 4	Set 5	Total	Report
16 Nov	12:05	Panasonic Panthers	3–0	JT Thunders	25–21	25–22	25–22			75–65	Report Stats
16 Nov	13:00	Toray Arrows	1–3	Wolf Dogs Nagoya	25–22	21–25	19–25	21–25		86–97	Report Stats
16 Nov	15:30	VC Nagano Tridents	0–3	Osaka Blazers Sakai	21–25	18–25	24–26	12–15		75–91	Report Stats
16 Nov	16:00	JTEKT Stings	3–1	Oita Miyoshi Weisse Adler	25–21	26–24	21–25	25–19		97–89	Report Stats
16 Nov	17:00	Suntory Sunbirds	3–0	FC Tokyo	28–26	25–20	25–17			78–63	Report Stats
17 Nov	11:30	Panasonic Panthers	3–0	Osaka Blazers Sakai	25–20	25–19	25–21			75–60	Report Stats
17 Nov	12:00	Toray Arrows	0–3	JTEKT Stings	21–25	15–25	18–25			54–75	Report Stats
17 Nov	15:00	VC Nagano Tridents	0–3	JT Thunders	18–25	18–25	23–25			59–75	Report Stats
17 Nov	15:00	Wolf Dogs Nagoya	3–0	Oita Miyoshi Weisse Adler	25–18	25–14	25–16			75–48	Report Stats

==== Week 5 ====
===== Stadium =====
Stadium 1	Stadium 2	Stadium 3
Kariya	Sakai	Ōta
Wing Arena Kariya	Sakai City Kanaoka Park Gymnasium	Ota City General Gymnasium
Wolf Dogs Nagoya; VC Nagano Tridents; JTEKT Stings; Panasonic Panthers	Osaka Blazers Sakai; JT Thunders	Suntory Sunbirds; Toray Arrows; FC Tokyo; Oita Miyoshi Weisse Adler

===== Results =====
- All times are Japan Standard Time (UTC+09:00).

Date	Time		Score		Set 1	Set 2	Set 3	Set 4	Set 5	Total	Report
23 Nov	12:00	Wolf Dogs Nagoya	3–0	VC Nagano Tridents	25–18	25–19	25–16			75–53	Report Stats
23 Nov	13:00	Osaka Blazers Sakai	2–3	JT Thunders	25–21	25–23	21–25	18–25	8–15	97–109	Report Stats
23 Nov	13:00	Suntory Sunbirds	3–1	Toray Arrows	23–25	25–19	25–23	25–19		98–86	Report Stats
23 Nov	15:00	JTEKT Stings	0–3	Panasonic Panthers	17–25	21–25	19–25			57–75	Report Stats
23 Nov	16:00	FC Tokyo	3–2	Oita Miyoshi Weisse Adler	25–21	25–16	20–25	23–25	15–12	108–99	Report Stats
24 Nov	12:00	Suntory Sunbirds	3–0	Oita Miyoshi Weisse Adler	25–12	25–19	31–29			81–60	Report Stats
24 Nov	12:00	Wolf Dogs Nagoya	1–3	Panasonic Panthers	25–16	21–25	22–25	20–25		88–91	Report Stats
23 Nov	15:00	JTEKT Stings	3–0	VC Nagano Tridents	25–16	25–16	25–16			75–48	Report Stats
23 Nov	15:00	Toray Arrows	3–2	FC Tokyo	25–22	21–25	21–25	25–20	15–9	107–101	Report Stats

=== Leg 2 ===
==== Week 1 ====
===== Stadium =====
Stadium 1	Stadium 2	Stadium 3
Kure	Ina	Komaki
Kure City General Gymnasium	ELECOM Logitech Arena	Park Arena Komaki
JT Thunders; FC Tokyo; Toray Arrows; JTEKT Stings	VC Nagano Tridents; Oita Miyoshi Weisse Adler	Wolf Dogs Nagoya; Osaka Blazers Sakai; Panasonic Panthers; Suntory Sunbirds

===== Results =====
- All times are Japan Standard Time (UTC+09:00).

Date	Time		Score		Set 1	Set 2	Set 3	Set 4	Set 5	Total	Report
30 Nov	12:00	JT Thunders	3–0	FC Tokyo	25–20	25–16	25–16			75–52	Report Stats
30 Nov	13:00	VC Nagano Tridents	3–1	Oita Miyoshi Weisse Adler	25–23	22–25	25–13	25–23		97–84	Report Stats
30 Nov	13:05	Wolf Dogs Nagoya	1–3	Osaka Blazers Sakai	25–19	16–25	18–25	18–25		77–94	Report Stats
30 Nov	14:30	Toray Arrows	2–3	JTEKT Stings	21–25	25–22	25–23	20–25	13–15	104–110	Report Stats
30 Nov	15:55	Panasonic Panthers	3–1	Suntory Sunbirds	25–22	25–21	17–25	25–17		92–85	Report Stats
1 Dec	11:30	JTEKT Stings	3–1	FC Tokyo	21–25	25–18	25–20	29–27		100–90	Report Stats
1 Dec	12:00	Wolf Dogs Nagoya	0–3	Suntory Sunbirds	23–25	16–25	27–29			66–79	Report Stats
1 Dec	14:00	JT Thunders	3–2	Toray Arrows	19–25	25–16	28–30	25–17	15–12	112–100	Report Stats
1 Dec	14:30	Panasonic Panthers	3–1	Osaka Blazers Sakai	23–25	25–16	25–15	33–31		106–87	Report Stats

==== Week 2 ====
===== Stadium =====
Stadium 1	Stadium 2	Stadium 3
Matsumoto	Wakayama	Tokyo
Matsumoto City Gymnasium	Wakayama Big Whale	Komazawa Gymnasium
JTEKT Stings; Oita Miyoshi Weisse Adler; VC Nagano Tridents; JT Thunders	Osaka Blazers Sakai; Suntory Sunbirds	FC Tokyo; Panasonic Panthers; Toray Arrows; Wolf Dogs Nagoya

===== Results =====
- All times are Japan Standard Time (UTC+09:00).

Date	Time		Score		Set 1	Set 2	Set 3	Set 4	Set 5	Total	Report
7 Dec	12:00	JTEKT Stings	3–0	Oita Miyoshi Weisse Adler	25–16	25–21	25–18			75–55	Report Stats
7 Dec	13:05	Osaka Blazers Sakai	1–3	Suntory Sunbirds	25–27	22–25	25–23	31–33		103–108	Report Stats
7 Dec	13:05	FC Tokyo	1–3	Panasonic Panthers	22–25	34–36	39–37	21–25		116–123	Report Stats
7 Dec	15:30	VC Nagano Tridents	0–3	JT Thunders	20–25	20–25	13–25			53–75	Report Stats
7 Dec	16:50	Toray Arrows	3–1	Wolf Dogs Nagoya	25–22	25–21	20–25	25–18		95–86	Report Stats
8 Dec	11:30	JT Thunders	3–0	Oita Miyoshi Weisse Adler	25–13	25–14	25–16			75–43	Report Stats
8 Dec	12:00	Panasonic Panthers	3–2	Toray Arrows	20–25	25–16	25–21	22–25	15–12	107–99	Report Stats
8 Dec	15:00	VC Nagano Tridents	0–3	JTEKT Stings	16–25	21–25	17–25			54–75	Report Stats
8 Dec	15:15	FC Tokyo	3–2	Wolf Dogs Nagoya	20–25	25–21	25–20	20–25	15–7	105–98	Report Stats

==== Week 3 ====
===== Stadium =====
Stadium 1	Stadium 2	Stadium 3
Beppu	Tokushima	Hirakata
Beppu B-con Plaza	Asty Tokushima	Panasonic Arena
FC Tokyo; VC Nagano Tridents; Oita Miyoshi Weisse Adler; Toray Arrows	JTEKT Stings; Suntory Sunbirds; JT Thunders; Osaka Blazers Sakai	Wolf Dogs Nagoya; Panasonic Panthers

===== Results =====
- All times are Japan Standard Time (UTC+09:00).

Date	Time		Score		Set 1	Set 2	Set 3	Set 4	Set 5	Total	Report
14 Dec	12:00	FC Tokyo	3–1	VC Nagano Tridents	25–19	25–18	19–25	25–23		94–85	Report Stats
14 Dec	13:00	JTEKT Stings	3–2	Suntory Sunbirds	25–15	25–20	11–25	20–25	17–15	98–100	Report Stats
14 Dec	14:00	Panasonic Panthers	3–0	Wolf Dogs Nagoya	25–17	25–21	25–18			75–56	Report Stats
14 Dec	15:00	Oita Miyoshi Weisse Adler	0–3	Toray Arrows	28–30	18–25	22–25			68–80	Report Stats
14 Dec	16:10	JT Thunders	3–0	Osaka Blazers Sakai	25–16	25–23	25–19			75–58	Report Stats
15 Dec	12:00	Toray Arrows	3–1	VC Nagano Tridents	25–21	25–20	23–25	25–20		98–86	Report Stats
15 Dec	13:00	JTEKT Stings	3–0	Osaka Blazers Sakai	25–20	27–25	25–19			77–64	Report Stats
15 Dec	15:00	Oita Miyoshi Weisse Adler	3–0	FC Tokyo	25–23	25–22	25–18			75–63	Report Stats
15 Dec	16:00	JT Thunders	3–0	Suntory Sunbirds	25–19	25–16	25–22			75–57	Report Stats

==== Week 4 ====
===== Stadium =====
Stadium 1	Stadium 2	Stadium 3
Hiroshima	Mishima	Nagoya
Higashi Hiroshima Athletic Park Gymnasium	Mishima City Gymnasium	Takeda Teva Ocean Arena
JTEKT Stings; JT Thunders	Toray Arrows; Osaka Blazers Sakai; Suntory Sunbirds; FC Tokyo	Wolf Dogs Nagoya; VC Nagano Tridents; Panasonic Panthers; Oita Miyoshi Weisse Adler

===== Results =====
- All times are Japan Standard Time (UTC+09:00).

Date	Time		Score		Set 1	Set 2	Set 3	Set 4	Set 5	Total	Report
21 Dec	13:00	JT Thunders	2–3	JTEKT Stings	19–25	25–19	23–25	25–21	8–15	100–105	Report Stats
21 Dec	13:00	Toray Arrows	2–3	Osaka Blazers Sakai	25–21	17–25	22–25	25–22	12–15	101–108	Report Stats
21 Dec	13:00	Wolf Dogs Nagoya	3–0	VC Nagano Tridents	25–22	25–23	25–21			75–66	Report Stats
21 Dec	15:30	Panasonic Panthers	3–0	Oita Miyoshi Weisse Adler	25–17	25–18	25–19			75–54	Report Stats
21 Dec	16:25	Suntory Sunbirds	3–0	FC Tokyo	25–20	28–26	25–20			78–66	Report Stats
22 Dec	12:00	Osaka Blazers Sakai	3–0	FC Tokyo	25–20	25–20	25–20			75–60	Report Stats
22 Dec	12:00	Wolf Dogs Nagoya	3–2	Oita Miyoshi Weisse Adler	25–19	26–28	25–23			76–70	Report Stats
22 Dec	15:00	Toray Arrows	0–3	Suntory Sunbirds	17–25	19–25	24–26			60–76	Report Stats
22 Dec	15:15	Panasonic Panthers	3–0	VC Nagano Tridents	25–18	25–16	25–19			75–53	Report Stats

==== Week 5 ====
===== Stadium =====
Stadium 1	Stadium 2	Stadium 3
Hiroshima	Kumamoto	Sumida
Hiroshima Prefectural Sports Center	Kumamoto Prefectural Gymnasium	Sumida City Gymnasium
JT Thunders; Panasonic Panthers; Wolf Dogs Nagoya; JTEKT Stings	Suntory Sunbirds; Oita Miyoshi Weisse Adler; Osaka Blazers Sakai; VC Nagano Tridents	Toray Arrows; FC Tokyo

===== Results =====
- All times are Japan Standard Time (UTC+09:00).

Date	Time		Score		Set 1	Set 2	Set 3	Set 4	Set 5	Total	Report
11 Jan	12:30	JT Thunders	0–3	Panasonic Panthers	23–25	20–25	21–25			64–75	Report Stats
11 Jan	13:00	Suntory Sunbirds	3–0	Oita Miyoshi Weisse Adler	25–23	25–17	25–17			75–57	Report Stats
11 Jan	15:00	FC Tokyo	1–3	Toray Arrows	24–26	23–25	25–23	21–25		93–99	Report Stats
11 Jan	15:30	Wolf Dogs Nagoya	2–3	JTEKT Stings	25–18	19–25	26–24	19–25	12–15	101–107	Report Stats
11 Jan	16:00	Osaka Blazers Sakai	3–0	VC Nagano Tridents	25–21	25–16	25–15			75–52	Report Stats
12 Jan	12:00	Suntory Sunbirds	3–1	VC Nagano Tridents	25–17	25–23	23–25	25–11		98–76	Report Stats
12 Jan	12:40	JT Thunders	3–1	Wolf Dogs Nagoya	25–22	25–23	21–25	26–24		97–94	Report Stats
12 Jan	15:00	Osaka Blazers Sakai	3–0	Oita Miyoshi Weisse Adler	25–17	26–24	25–15			76–56	Report Stats
12 Jan	15:45	Panasonic Panthers	0–3	JTEKT Stings	20–25	19–25	14–25			53–75	Report Stats

=== Leg 3 ===
==== Week 1 ====
===== Stadium =====
Stadium 1	Stadium 2	Stadium 3
Kashihara	Okinawa	Ichinomiya
JTEKT Arena Nara	Okinawa City Gymnasium	DIADORA Arena
Toray Arrows; FC Tokyo; JTEKT Stings; VC Nagano Tridents	JT Thunders; Oita Miyoshi Weisse Adler; Panasonic Panthers; Osaka Blazers Sakai	Wolf Dogs Nagoya; Suntory Sunbirds

===== Results =====
- All times are Japan Standard Time (UTC+09:00).

Date	Time		Score		Set 1	Set 2	Set 3	Set 4	Set 5	Total	Report
18 Jan	12:00	Toray Arrows	2–3	FC Tokyo	15–25	25–22	25–18	21–25	12–15	98–105	Report Stats
18 Jan	12:00	JT Thunders	3–1	Oita Miyoshi Weisse Adler	25–17	22–25	25–18	25–19		97–79	Report Stats
18 Jan	14:00	Wolf Dogs Nagoya	1–3	Suntory Sunbirds	25–21	18–25	20–25	24–25		87–96	Report Stats
18 Jan	15:00	JTEKT Stings	3–1	FC Tokyo	25–22	21–25	25–17	25–20		96–84	Report Stats
18 Jan	15:00	Panasonic Panthers	3–1	Suntory Sunbirds	25–18	22–25	25–20	25–20		97–83	Report Stats
19 Jan	12:00	FC Tokyo	3–1	VC Nagano Tridents	26–24	23–25	25–17	25–20		99–86	Report Stats
19 Jan	12:00	JT Thunders	3–0	Osaka Blazers Sakai	25–20	25–18	25–20			75–58	Report Stats
19 Jan	15:00	JTEKT Stings	3–0	Toray Arrows	25–14	25–20	25–20			75–54	Report Stats
19 Jan	15:00	Panasonic Panthers	3–0	Oita Miyoshi Weisse Adler	25–21	25–22	26–24			76–67	Report Stats

==== Week2 ====
===== Stadium =====
Stadium 1	Stadium 2	Stadium 3
Ōta	Hirakata	Minato-ku
Ota City General Gymnasium	Panasonic Arena	Osaka Municipal Central Gymnasium
Oita Miyoshi Weisse Adler; Osaka Blazers Sakai	Toray Arrows; JT Thunders; Panasonic Panthers; VC Nagano Tridents	Suntory Sunbirds; FC Tokyo; JTEKT Stings| Wolf Dogs Nagoya

===== Results =====
- All times are Japan Standard Time (UTC+09:00).

Date	Time		Score		Set 1	Set 2	Set 3	Set 4	Set 5	Total	Report
24 Jan	19:00	Oita Miyoshi Weisse Adler	0–3	Osaka Blazers Sakai	22–25	22–25	21–25			65–75	Report Stats
25 Jan	12:05	JT Thunders	3–0	Toray Arrows	25–17	25–23	25–20			75–60	Report Stats
25 Jan	13:00	Suntory Sunbirds	3–0	FC Tokyo	25–16	25–11	25–12			75–39	Report Stats
25 Jan	15:00	Panasonic Panthers	3–0	VC Nagano Tridents	25–14	27–25	25–18			77–57	Report Stats
25 Jan	16:00	Wolf Dogs Nagoya	2–3	JTEKT Stings	22–25	12–25	27–25	25–16	10–15	96–106	Report Stats
26 Jan	12:00	Suntory Sunbirds	3–0	JTEKT Stings	25–19	25–15	25–22			75–56	Report Stats
26 Jan	12:00	JT Thunders	3–0	VC Nagano Tridents	25–17	25–23	25–21			75–61	Report Stats
26 Jan	15:00	Wolf Dogs Nagoya	3–0	FC Tokyo	25–18	25–23	25–18			75–59	Report Stats
26 Jan	15:00	Panasonic Panthers	3–2	Toray Arrows	28–30	29–27	25–18	19–25	22–20	123–120	Report Stats

==== Week 3 ====
===== Stadium =====
Stadium 1	Stadium 2	Stadium 3
Kariya	Shizuoka	Komaki
Wing Arena Kariya	Konohana Arena	Park Arena Komaki
JTEKT Stings; FC Tokyo	Toray Arrows; Osaka Blazers Sakai; Oita Miyoshi Weisse Adler; VC Nagano Tridents	JT Thunders; Panasonic Panthers; Suntory Sunbirds; Wolf Dogs Nagoya

===== Results =====
- All times are Japan Standard Time (UTC+09:00).

Date	Time		Score		Set 1	Set 2	Set 3	Set 4	Set 5	Total	Report
31 Jan	19:15	JTEKT Stings	3–0	FC Tokyo	25–18	25–22	25–17			75–57	Report Stats
1 Feb	13:00	Toray Arrowsr	0–3	Osaka Blazers Sakai	21–25	18–25	22–25			61–75	Report Stats
1 Feb	13:00	Wolf Dogs Nagoya	1–3	JT Thunders	25–20	16–25	22–25	21–25		84–95	Report Stats
1 Feb	15:50	Panasonic Panthers	3–0	Suntory Sunbirds	25–18	25–13	30–28			80–59	Report Stats
1 Feb	16:00	Oita Miyoshi Weisse Adler	2–3	VC Nagano Tridents	20–25	18–25	25–23	25–20	10–15	98–108	Report Stats
2 Feb	12:00	Wolf Dogs Nagoya	1–3	Panasonic Panthers	29–27	19–25	21–25	15–25		84–102	Report Stats
2 Feb	13:00	Toray Arrowsr	3–0	Oita Miyoshi Weisse Adler	25–15	25–23	25–17			75–55	Report Stats
2 Feb	14:50	JT Thunders	1–3	Suntory Sunbirds	25–18	21–25	17–25	17–25		80–93	Report Stats
2 Feb	16:00	Osaka Blazers Sakai	3–0	VC Nagano Tridents	25–18	25–19	25–19			75–56	Report Stats

==== Week 4 ====
===== Stadium =====
Stadium 1	Stadium 2	Stadium 3
Sakai	Otsu	Okayama
Sakai City Kanaoka Park Gymnasium	Shiga Prefectural Gymnasium	Zip Arena Okayama
Osaka Blazers Sakai; Wolf Dogs Nagoya; Suntory Sunbirds; Oita Miyoshi Weisse Adler	Toray Arrows; VC Nagano Tridents	JTEKT Stings; FC Tokyo; JT Thunders; Panasonic Panthers

===== Results =====
- All times are Japan Standard Time (UTC+09:00).

Date	Time		Score		Set 1	Set 2	Set 3	Set 4	Set 5	Total	Report
8 Feb	12:00	Osaka Blazers Sakai	3–0	Wolf Dogs Nagoya	25–23	25–15	25–21			75–59	Report Stats
8 Feb	13:00	Toray Arrows	3–2	VC Nagano Tridents	25–23	18–25	22–25	25–19	16–14	106–106	Report Stats
8 Feb	13:00	JT Thunders	3–0	FC Tokyo	25–20	25–19	25–16			75–55	Report Stats
8 Feb	15:00	Suntory Sunbirds	1–3	Oita Miyoshi Weisse Adler	25–21	23–25	19–25	23–25		90–96	Report Stats
8 Feb	16:00	Panasonic Panthers	3–0	JTEKT Stings	25–20	25–19	25–19			75–58	Report Stats
9 Feb	12:00	Osaka Blazers Sakai	3–0	Suntory Sunbirds	25–21	25–22	25–16			75–59	Report Stats
9 Feb	13:00	Panasonic Panthers	3–0	FC Tokyo	25–19	25–18	25–22			75–59	Report Stats
9 Feb	15:00	Wolf Dogs Nagoya	3–2	Oita Miyoshi Weisse Adler	25–17	24–26	19–25	25–14	15–8	108–90	Report Stats
9 Feb	16:00	JT Thunders	1–3	JTEKT Stings	21–25	21–25	25–18	19–25		86–93	Report Stats

==== Week 5 ====
===== Stadium =====
Stadium 1	Stadium 2	Stadium 3
Matsumoto	Kashihara	Okayama
Matsumoto City Gymnasium	JTEKT Arena Nara	Tottori Prefectural Fuse Sports Park Athletics Stadium
Toray Arrows; Suntory Sunbirds; VC Nagano Tridents; Wolf Dogs Nagoya	FC Tokyo; Oita Miyoshi Weisse Adler; JTEKT Stings; Osaka Blazers Sakai	JT Thunders; Panasonic Panthers

===== Results =====
- All times are Japan Standard Time (UTC+09:00).

Date	Time		Score		Set 1	Set 2	Set 3	Set 4	Set 5	Total	Report
15 Feb	12:00	Toray Arrows	3–1	Suntory Sunbirds	25–17	25–20	21–25	25–22		96–84	Report Stats
15 Feb	12:00	FC Tokyo	3–2	Oita Miyoshi Weisse Adler	25–18	26–24	23–25	20–25	15–9	109–101	Report Stats
15 Feb	13:00	JT Thunders	3–0	Panasonic Panthers	25–21	25–19	26–24			76–64	Report Stats
15 Feb	15:05	JTEKT Stings	2–3	Osaka Blazers Sakai	28–26	17–25	19–25	25–20	12–15	101–111	Report Stats
15 Feb	15:30	VC Nagano Tridents	0–3	Wolf Dogs Nagoya	31–33	19–25	18–25			68–83	Report Stats
16 Feb	11:30	Toray Arrows	3–2	Wolf Dogs Nagoya	20–25	26–28	26–24	25–23	15–12	112–112	Report Stats
16 Feb	12:00	Osaka Blazers Sakai	3–2	FC Tokyo	26–24	25–11	19–25	23–25	15–13	108–98	Report Stats
16 Feb	15:05	JTEKT Stings	3–0	Oita Miyoshi Weisse Adler	25–15	28–26	25–18			78–59	Report Stats
16 Feb	15:15	VC Nagano Tridents	1–3	Suntory Sunbirds	25–20	18–25	20–25	17–25		80–95	Report Stats

== Final Stage ==
=== Game 1 (5th place playoff) ===
==== Procedure ====
The 5th place of Regular Round will compete against the 4th place, the winner will pass to the 4th place playoff

==== Result ====
February 22, 2020; 14:08	Suntory Sunbirds	3-0	Osaka Blazers Sakai	F-pico Arena Fukuyama, Fukuyama; Attendance: 2,000; Referees: Ono Masato
February 22, 2020; 14:08	(25-19,28-26,26-24); Report Stats			F-pico Arena Fukuyama, Fukuyama; Attendance: 2,000; Referees: Ono Masato

=== Game 2 (4th place playoff) ===
==== Procedure ====
The winner of Game 1 will compete against the 3rd place of Regular Round, the winner will pass to the Semifinal Round

==== Result ====
February 23, 2020; 14:08	JT Thunders	1-3	Suntory Sunbirds	F-pico Arena Fukuyama, Fukuyama; Attendance: 2,900; Referees: Shingo Yamamoto
February 23, 2020; 14:08	(26-24,11-25,19-25,14-25); Report Stats			F-pico Arena Fukuyama, Fukuyama; Attendance: 2,900; Referees: Shingo Yamamoto

=== Semifinal (3rd place playoff) ===
==== Procedure ====
The winner of Game 2 will compete against the 2nd place of Regular Round, the winner will pass to the Final Round

==== Result ====
February 24, 2020; 14:08	JTEKT Stings	3-1	Suntory Sunbirds	F-pico Arena Fukuyama, Fukuyama; Attendance: 2,700; Referees: Shin Muranaka
February 24, 2020; 14:08	(19-25,25-22,25-17,29-27); Report Stats			F-pico Arena Fukuyama, Fukuyama; Attendance: 2,700; Referees: Shin Muranaka

=== Final ===
The final match was held without spectators due to COVID-19 pandemic.

Semifinal			Final
			2	Panasonic Panthers	2
1	JTEKT Stings	3	1	JTEKT Stings	3
3	Suntory Sunbirds	1

==== Result ====
February 29, 2020; 17:10	Panasonic Panthers	2-3	JTEKT Stings	Takasaki Arena, Takasaki; Attendance: 0 Referees: Shin Muranaka
February 29, 2020; 17:10	(25-17,22-25,22-25,28-26,10-15); Report Stats			Takasaki Arena, Takasaki; Attendance: 0 Referees: Shin Muranaka

== Final standing ==
Rank	Team
1st place, gold medalist(s)	JTEKT Stings
2nd place, silver medalist(s)	Panasonic Panthers
3rd place, bronze medalist(s)	Suntory Sunbirds
4	JT Thunders
5	Osaka Blazers Sakai
6	Toray Arrows
7	Wolf Dogs Nagoya
8	FC Tokyo
9	Oita Miyoshi Weisse Adler
10	VC Nagano Tridents

Qualified for the 2020 Asian Men's Club Volleyball Championship

2019–20 V.League Division 1 Men's Champions
Roster:
- Yuto Fujinaka
- Akitomo Kanamura
- Yamato Fushimi
- Taichi Fukuyama
- Rao Shuhan
- Matey Kaziyski
- Kouhei Yanagisawa
- Hiroya Kori
- Masatoshi Tatsumi
- Mitsuki Kobayashi
- Ryosuke Hakamaya
- Ryo Kohrogi
- Yuji Nishida
- Souta Nakane
- Sho Kuboyama
- Ryuta Homma (c)
- Junpei Michii
- Hiroaki Asano

Head coach: Shinji Takahashi

== Awards ==
The list of awards which distributed at the end of the season

=== Individual ===
Most Valuable Player

- (Japan) Yuji Nishida

Winner Head Coach

- (Japan) Shinji Takahashi

Fighting-spirit

- (Japan) Kunihiro Shimizu

Top scorer

- (Japan) Yuji Nishida

Best Spiker

- (Japan) Taishi Onodera

Best Blocker

- (Japan) Taishi Onodera

Best Server

- (Japan) Yuji Nishida

Best Serve Receiver

- (Japan) Taiki Tsuruda

Best Receiver

- (Japan) Taiki Tsuruda

Best 6

- (Japan) Yuji Nishida
- (Poland) Michał Kubiak
- (Russia) Dmitry Muserskiy
- (China) Rao Shuhan
- (Japan) Taishi Onodera
- (Japan) Hideomi Fukatsu

Best Libero

- (Japan) Ryuta Homma

Best New Player

- (Japan) Yuto Fujinaka

=== Special Award ===
V.League Honor Award

The award was distributed to players who participate in 10 seasons or more, 230 games or more. Except for Takeshi Nagano who received 10 or more individual awards.

- (Japan) Akitomo Kanamaru
- (Japan) Hirotaka Kon
- (Japan) Kunihiro Shimizu
- (Japan) Shohei Uchiyama
- (Japan) Takeshi Nagano

== See also ==
- 2019–20 V.League Division 1 Women's
