= Yuji Nishida =

Japanese male volleyball player (born 2000)

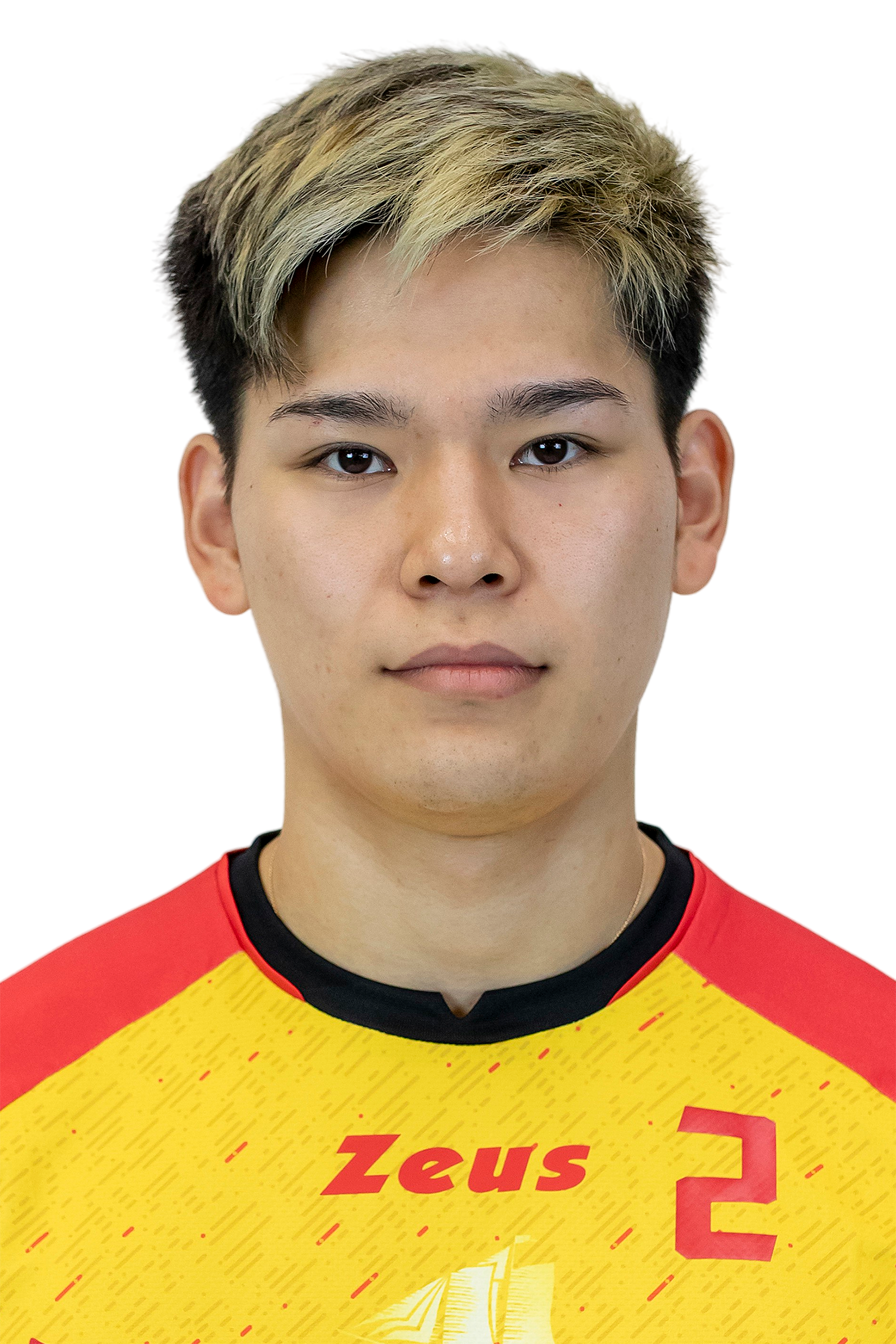
- Nishida in Callipo Volley's jersey

Personal information
- Full name: Yuji Nishida
- Born: 30 January 2000 (age 26) Mie Prefecture, Japan
- Home town: Inabe, Mie Prefecture
- Height: 1.87 m (6 ft 2 in)
- Weight: 87 kg (192 lb)
- Spike: 346 cm (136 in)
- Block: 330 cm (130 in)

Volleyball information
- Position: Opposite spiker
- Current club: (Japan) Osaka Bluteon (Note: The club's former name is Panasonic Panthers)
- Number: 1 (national team); 11 (club)

Career
- Years: Team
- 2017–2021: (Japan) JTEKT Stings
- 2021–2022: (Italy) Volley Callipo
- 2022–2023: (Japan) JTEKT Stings
- 2023–present: (Japan) Osaka bluteon

National team
- Years: Team
- 2018–present: Japan
Medal record
Men's volleyball
Representing Japan
FIVB Nations League
Silver medal – second place	2024 Łódź	Team
Bronze medal – third place	2023 Gdańsk	Team
Asian Championship
Gold medal – first place	2023 Urmia	Team
Gold medal – first place	2026 Kitakyushu	Team
Bronze medal – third place	2019 Tehran	Team
Asian Youth Championship
Gold medal – first place	2017 Naypyidaw	Team

Yuji Nishida

YouTube information
- Channel: 西田有志チャンネルYuji Nishida YouTube
- Years active: 2020-present
- Subscribers: 580 thousand
- Views: 58 million
- Last updated: November 19, 2025

Yuji Nishida (西田 有志, Nishida Yūji; born 30 January 2000) is a Japanese volleyball player who plays as an opposite for SV League club Osaka Bluteon, which he captains, and the Japanese national team.

Nishida made his debut with JTEKT Stings at V.League on 6 January 2018 in a match against Sakai's Osaka Blazers Sakai, and made his first international performance with the Japanese national team in 2018 FIVB Volleyball Men's Nations League.

Nishida transferred to play for Volley Callipo in the Italian Volleyball League for the 2021–22 season.

Nishida led the national team to seventh place at the 2020 Tokyo Olympics, its best result in 29 years, as well as in 2024 Paris Olympics which they finished in 7th place after losing in the quarterfinal match to Italy.

== Career ==
=== Elementary school years ===
Nishida first started playing volleyball due to his elder sister and brother both playing the game, and joined the same team as his brother, the "Daian Beetles."

While being fascinated by the Olympics, his attention was caught by Kunihiro Shimizu, a left-handed "opposite" like him who inspired him to want to compete in the Olympics.

In his fourth year of elementary school, Nishida achieved a huge goal of winning the 29th All Japan Volleyball Tournament in Mie Prefecture.

In his sixth year of elementary school, he became the captain and led the team to win the President's Cup of Mie Prefecture Club Volleyball Federation.

=== Middle school years ===
After graduation, he went to a local junior high (middle school) which was not a powerhouse.

Nishida had the opportunity to participate in Kaisei High School's volleyball club practice in Yokkaichi, Mie Prefecture as he was a regular player since freshman year. His play there caught the attention of Masanobu Onishi, the volleyball team manager at that time, and Katsunari Fujita, the head of the team. In June of the same year, he joined the junior high school club team 'NFO Ocean Star', recommended by Fujita.

In March 2013, Nishida was selected for the U-14 team in the Hokusei district of Mie Prefecture. In August of the same year, he was selected for the Mie Prefecture selection team and competed with teams from all over Japan in the Junior Olympic Cup held in December.

=== High school years ===
He chose to decline the powerhouses in his prefectures and chose to go to Kaisei High School which had never qualified for the national volleyball tournament. He later joined the newly established U-19 of the local club team Veertien Mie. In June, they won the U-19 boys division of the Mie Prefecture Young Volleyball Championship, and in September, they won the national championship. Nishida received the Japan Young Club Volleyball Federation Award as an outstanding player in that tournament.

Just as he had done in junior high school, Nishida practiced with three different teams and went on to compete in the Mie Prefectural High School Championship (Haruko Preliminaries) in November.

=== Career and Japan national team ===
==== 2017/18 season ====
In March 2017, Nishida was named in Japan men's national under-19 volleyball team and competed in 2017 Asian Boys' U19 Volleyball Championship. In October 2017, he joined club JTEKT Stings.

Nishida's V.League debut was on January 6, 2018, in a match against Sakai Blazers. His impressive debut at the young age of 17 soon earned him a position in JTEKT's starting six, as well as on Japan men's national volleyball team.

Nishida received the Wakawashi Award in Kurowashiki All Japan Volleyball Tournament, which is the Rookie of the Year award.

==== 2018/19 season ====
He was called up to the Senior National team for the first time in April at the age of 18. Nishida made his senior national team debut on May 25, 2018, in a Nations League match in Rouen, France. He was named a starter in that match against Australia.

Nishida was one of the youngest players in the 2018 roster of the Japan men's national volleyball team and FIVB cup final.

In June 2018, he played a pivotal role in securing Japan's first win in 11 years against Italy where he collected 24 points from 21 spikes and 3 aces.

Then, in September, Nishida competed in the 2018 FIVB Volleyball Men's World Championship, jointly hosted by Italy and Bulgaria. He had a minor foot injury and missed the first match against Italy. In a match against Argentina, he became the youngest player ever to score 30 points in a match.

In the V.League 2018–19 season, Nishida and Issei Otake from Panasonic Panthers jointly won the Best New Player award.

==== 2019/20 season ====
In April 2019, Yuji Nishida was selected to represent Japan for the second year in a row. In June, Nishida broke serving records in the VNL history after hitting 7 aces in a single game during a match against Bulgaria.

The following October, the 2019 FIVB Volleyball Men's World Cup was held in Japan. He was awarded "Best server" and "Best opposite" for his impressive performances.

Nishida went on to lead his team to their first V.League title. Nishida ranked 1st in the "High Scorer" and "Serve Effectiveness Rate" categories as well as being league MVP.

==== 2020/21 season ====
In February 2020, Nishida was named on Japan's national team roster.

In December 2020, JTEKT Stings were crowned champions of the Emperor's Cup and Empress' Cup All Japan Volleyball Championship after defeating the Panasonic Panthers 3–1 sets.

==== 2021/22 season ====
On April 5, 2021, Japan Volleyball Association (JVA) announced the Japanese National Team roster for 2021, where Nishida was named as part of the 25-man provisional roster.

In the "2021 Volleyball Men's National Team Red and White Match", an intra-team scrimmage between the players of the Japanese National Team, Nishida was named as a starting player of the red team. Early on in the first set, Nishida's right ankle was injured after he landed awkwardly from blocking. Unable to walk by himself, he was carried from the court and taken to the hospital. After an X-ray scan, the head coach of the team reported that Nishida had no fractures and had been diagnosed with a sprain on the right ankle.

Nishida was again named in the Japanese National Team squad for the 2021 FIVB Volleyball Men's Nations League where the competition would be held in Rimini, Italy, although he had not fully recovered yet at this point. He returned in the third week of the tournament for the match against Poland as a substitute and returned to the starting line up in the match against Bulgaria.

On June 21, Japan Volleyball Association announced the Japanese National Team roster for 2020 Tokyo Olympics, where Nishida was once again selected as a member of the starting line-up. He became the first player of the 2020 Tokyo Olympics to break the 30–point scoring mark in the men's division and was the tenth player, and first Japanese player, since the introduction of the rally scoring system.

On August 9, Nishida officially announced that he would transfer to play for the Italian club Volley Callipo in the Italian Volleyball League for the 2021–22 season.

On November 21, in the match against Volley Lube, he injured his left calf early in the second set, which took him off the court.

Nishida was sidelined for two months before returning on January 12 in a match against Gas Sales Blueenergy Piacenza.

He thrice received MVP of the match awards despite an injury and a subsequent two-month recovery. Nishida would become the highest scorer of his team, with a personal one-match record of 29 points, and hold the record for the most aces in one match during the league's first round of the 2021/22 season with eight aces.

In March 2022, it was reported that at the end of the season that Nishida would return to the V.League in Japan.

==== 2022/23 season ====
On April 4, 2022, the Japan Volleyball Association (JVA) announced the 2022 Japanese roster for competing in Nations League, Asian Games and World Championship. Nishida was named amongst the 35-player roster not joining the team in the 2021 Asian Men's Volleyball Championship tournament the previous year, due to his preparation for Italian league and subsequent injury. His national team jersey number changed from No. 11 to No. 1.

On June 1, JTEKT Stings announced that Nishida would join the club again for 2022-23 V.League Season.

At the Nations League, Nishida scored the highest of the Japanese team and the third highest in the first round with 201 points, including 162 attacks, 10 blocks and 29 aces. He delivered 28 points in a victory after a full set match over Italy on June 24, 2022, advancing to the quarter-finals of the tournament. Nishida and the Japanese team then faced France which they lost in a 3–0 set, eliminating them from the competition, placing fifth overall.

On August 26, the Japanese team played their first match in the 2022 World Championship against Qatar where they won in three straight sets. Nishida contributed 17 points, including 4 blocks. In the next two games, the Japanese team faced Brazil and Cuba in which they lost and won, respectively. With a record of 2–1, Japan placed second behind Brazil in the group stages and Japan advanced to the final round for the first time since 2006. They were matched up against France, the 2020 Olympics and the Nations League gold medallists, in the round of 16, where they eventually lost 3–2 after a tough contest. Nishida finished with a total of 31 points, the highest of all the players on both teams. The result eliminated Japan from the tournament, finishing in 12th place.

Two weeks after the 2022-23 V.League season began, Nishida came down with an unknown illness, which caused him to miss three weeks at the start of the season with a continuous high fever. During this time, Nishida underwent multiple medical tests, which all came back inconclusive. Nishida began to wonder, "Will I be able to play volleyball this year with JTEKT?" as he explained in a later announcement about his extended absence from competition. Fortunately, all the symptoms gradually disappeared, and Nishida was cleared to play volleyball again. After his return, Nishida was able to lead his team to win the 2022 Emperor's Cup title in three straight sets against Toray Arrows.

==== 2023/24 season ====
It was announced that Nishida joined Panasonic Panthers for the 2023/24 season.

In 2023 FIVB Volleyball Men's Nations League, Nishida joined the team with 14 games, which won 12 consecutive games and advanced to the final round after placing second in the preliminary round. Yuji had an injury at his back which made him a substitute for Japan, as Kento Miyaura, the other Japanese left-handed opposite, led the team in the semi-final against Poland and third place game against Italy Eventually, Japanese team took the first bronze medal ever after won Italy with a full set match.

In August, Asian Championship, the Japanese team won its 10th title in the competition defeating Iran in straight sets.

The team then competed at The qualification tournament for the 2024 Summer Olympics, where they needed to finish top 2 in their pool to qualify. Japan placed 2nd in their pool with 5 wins and 2 losses and qualified for the Olympic Games.

In December 2023, the Panasonic Panthers beat the Wolfdogs Nagoya 3–1 sets in the 2023 Emperor's Cup with Nishida also winning the MVP award.

In the 2023–24 V.League, Nishida and his team finished 3rd in the regular season standings. In the final they faced the Suntory Sunbirds, and although Nishida was not a starting player but he put in a solid performance and scored 18 points. However, the Panthers were beaten 3-0 and finished with silver medals.

==== 2024/25 season ====
In April 2024, the JVA announced the national team roster for 2024 international tournaments, and Nishida was selected for the 6th consecutive season.

In June, the Panthers announced their squad for the 2024–25 season and confirmed that Nishida continued playing with the club and used the jersey number 11.

In the 2024 VNL, he led the team to finish 4th in the preliminary rounds with 9 wins and 3 losses. They then defeated Canada and Slovenia in the quarter-finals and semi-finals, respectively. The Japanese team advanced to the finals match for the first time in VNL history. They played France in the final, succumbing to a 1–3 set loss. They finished 2nd and took home the silver medal, the highest finish for the team in this tournament and the first silver medal in any major international tournament since 1977.

2024 Paris Olympics in August, the Japanese team advanced to compete with Italy in the quarterfinals. They faced the heartbreaking result by leading the first two sets, but lost the match 3–2 sets. However, Nishida helped the team with a total of 22 points and 3 aces. Nishida made the total score placed 8th of the top scorer category and the team finished 7th in the Olympic Games.

In 2024–25 SV.League, succeeded V.League as the highest league in Japan, Osaka Bluteon is the winner of the regular round, but ended in third place in the final round.

==== 2025/26 season ====
After the 2024 Paris Olympic Games, Nishida decided to take a year break from the national team to recover from his chronic injury. However, in April 2025, his name was on the national team roster. Nishida said he let the national team's coach, Laurent Tillie, put his name in the roster for calling when they needed. He also insists on playing only if an unforeseen circumstance happens.

In August, Osaka Bluteon announced that Nishida is assigned to be captain of the team in 2025–26 season.

In early 2026, there was international news coverage of Nishida performing an extreme dogeza during a match. Nishida accidentally hit a female judge with a powerful serve, and immediately ran towards her, throwing himself on the ground and sliding along with his face touching the floor as a form of apology.

In the end of the season, Nishida led the team to won the 2025–26 SV.League championship and he was named the Championship MVP.

==== 2026/27 season ====
For the national team, in 2026 VNL, Nishida reached the 1,000 VNL points and 100 ace milestone while leading Japan to win all 12 matches in the preliminary round. Later in September, Japan won the 11th title in Asian Championship history. Nishida distributed in the final match against Iran with a total of 18 points, the most in the match. Resulting Japan took the ticket to 2028 Summer Olympics in LA.

For the club team, he continues to lead the team as captain.

== Personal life ==
Nishida started playing volleyball after watching his sister playing the sport. He listed watching movies and shopping as his hobbies. He has an elder sister 8 years older than him and a brother 6 years older than him. In an interview, he said his idols are Yūki Ishikawa, Masahiro Yanagida, Michal Kubiak, and Hiroaki Asano.

=== Marriage ===
On December 31, 2022, Nishida announced through his Instagram that he had married fellow volleyball player Sarina Koga. On July 24, 2025, Nishida announced through his official social media account that he and Koga are expecting their first child. On December 8, 2025, his wife Koga, gave birth to their first child.

== Awards ==
=== Individuals ===
Nishida individual awards
Year	Tournament	Award
2018	Kurowashiki Tournament	Fighting Spirit Award
2018	Kurowashiki Tournament	Wakawashi Award
2018	Kurowashiki Tournament	Best 6
2019	V.League 1	Best Server
2019	V.League 1	Best Rookie of the Year
2019	FIVB World Cup	Best Opposite Spiker
2020	V.League 1	Most Valuable Player (MVP)
2020	V.League 1	Best Scorer
2020	V.League 1	Best Opposite Spiker
2020	V.League 1	Best 6
2021	V.League 1	Best Server
2021	V.League 1	Record Award Player
2023	Emperor's Cup	Most Valuable Player (MVP)
2026	SVL 2026	Final’s Most Valuable Player (MVP)

=== Club teams ===
Nishida awards with club teams
Year	Tournament	Award	Team	Ref.
2019	V.League 1	Champion	JTEKT Stings	
2021	Emperor's Cup	Champion	JTEKT Stings	
2022	Emperor's Cup	Champion	JTEKT Stings	
2023	Emperor's Cup	Champion	Osaka Bluteon	
2025	AVC Champions League	Runner-up	Osaka Bluteon	
2026	V.League 1	Champion	Osaka Bluteon	

=== National teams ===
Nishida awards with national teams
Year	Tournament	Award	Ref.
Junior national team
2017	Asian Boys' U19 Championship	Gold medal	
Senior national team
2019	Asian Championship	Bronze medal	
2023	Nations League	Bronze medal	
2023	Asian Championship	Gold medal	
2024	Nations League	Runner-up	

== Other ventures ==
In 2020, Nishida announced a partnership with Asics, a Japanese multinational corporation which produces sports equipment, through product promotions and advertisement.

In February 2021, Nishida had entered a sports sponsorship agreement with Zamst, a brand of athletic braces and care products. In October 2021, it was announced that Nishida had signed a partnership with CLEVER, a Japanese protein brand.

He started his own Youtube Channel on December 6, 2020, surpassing 100,000 subscribers in six months. Nishida established his personal apparel brand Crazy Jump, which was launched to the public in August 2022.

In April 2023, he reached 1 million followers on his Instagram account.

== Notes ==
Awards
Preceded by (Italy) Ivan Zaytsev	Best Opposite Spiker of FIVB Volleyball Men's World Cup; 2019	Succeeded by None
