= Ryuta Homma =

Japanese male volleyball player (born 2000)

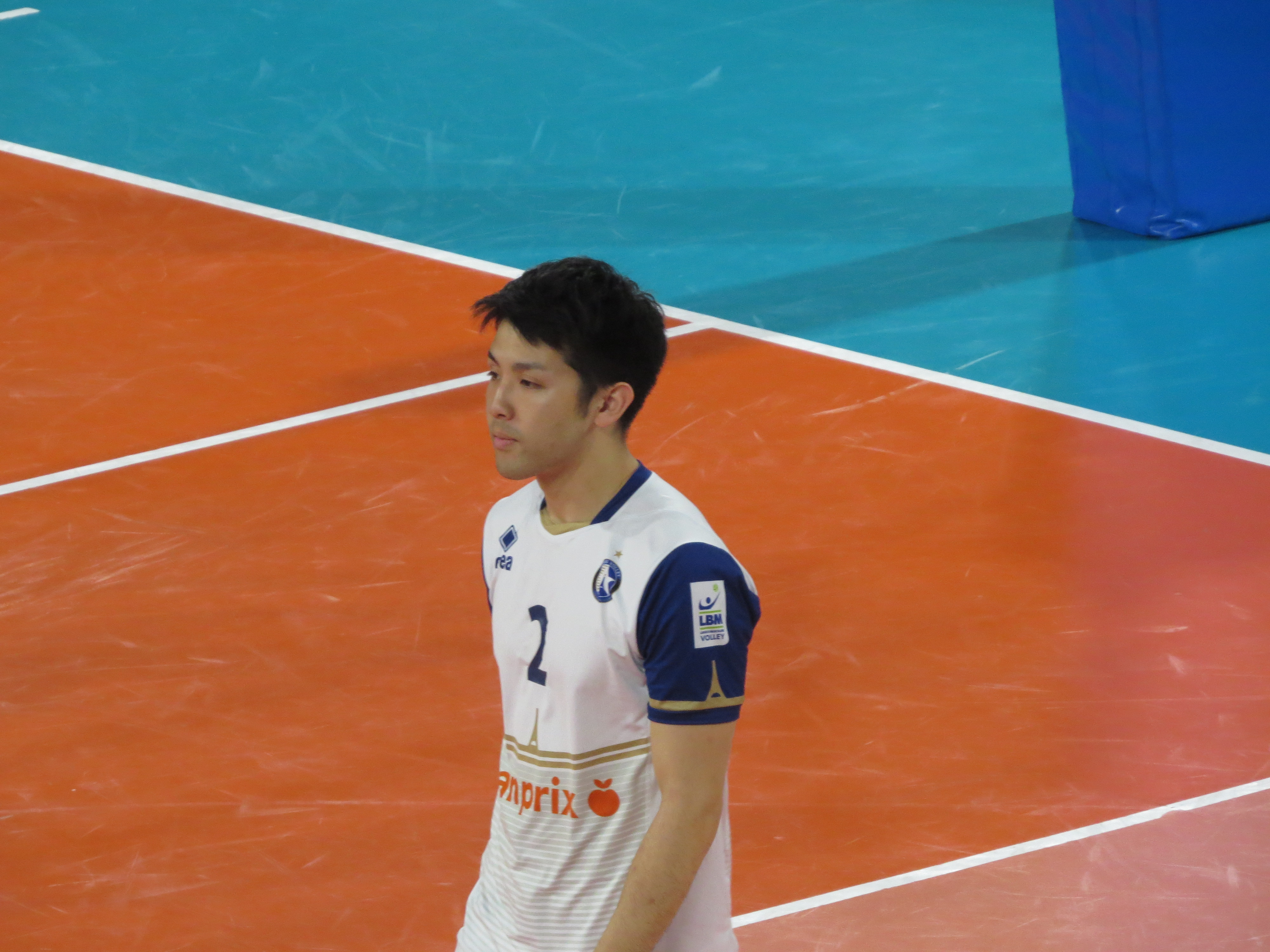

Personal information
- Full name: Ryuta Homma
- Nationality: Japanese
- Born: 17 October 1991 (age 35); Sagamihara, Kanagawa, Japan
- Height: 1.78 m (5 ft 10 in)
- Weight: 75 kg (165 lb)
- Spike: 325 cm (128 in)
- Block: 305 cm (120 in)
- Education: Waseda University

Volleyball information
- Position: Libero
- Current club: (Japan) JTEKT Stings
- Number: 17

Career
Years	Teams
2013–2018	(Japan) JTEKT Stings
2018–2019	(France) Paris Volley (loaned)
2019–present	(Japan) JTEKT Stings

National team
2018, 2020	Japan

Ryuta Homma (本間 隆太, Homma Ryūta; born 17 October 1991) is a Japanese male Volleyball player. On club level, he captained JTEKT Stings team, in V.League Division 1, since 2019–20 season. He is a former member of the Japan men's national volleyball team.

== Career ==
When he was in elementary school, he started playing volleyball under the influence of his family.

After graduated from Yaei High School, Homma entered Waseda University. The first two years in the college, he served as substitute of Wing spiker and Setter, but later, he was changed to Libero in the third year. And in the fourth year, the team won Kanto University Autumn League and All Japan Intercollegiate Volleyball Championship. Homma also won the Best Libero award in both tournaments.

In October 2013, he decided to join JTEKT Stings, which had just been promoted to the V.Premier League, the name was changed to V.League Division 1 in 2018.

In 2018, he was first elected as Japan men's national volleyball team representative. He transferred to Paris Volley in the 2018/19 season.

In the 2019/20 season, he returned to Stings and became captain. He led the team won the first V.League title of the club's history and received the Best Libero award.

In February 2024, club JTEKT Stings announced that Ryuta Homma will be retired after 2023/24 season. The last match will be March 10, 2024.

== Awards ==
=== Individual ===
- 2013 Kanto University Autumn League — Best Libero
- 2013 All Japan Intercollegiate Volleyball Championship — Best Libero
- 2019–20 V.League 1 — Best Libero

=== Club team ===
- 2013 Kanto University Autumn League — Champion, with Waseda University
- 2013 All Japan Intercollegiate Volleyball Championship — Champion, with Waseda University
- 2019–20 V.League 1 — Champion, with JTEKT Stings
- 2020 Emperor's Cup — Champion, with JTEKT Stings
- 2022 Emperor's Cup — Champion, with JTEKT Stings

== See also ==
- Ryuta Homma profile at JTEKT Stings website
- Ryuta Homma profile at V.League website
- List of Waseda University people
