= Taichi Fukuyama =

Japanese volleyball player (born 1993)

Personal information
- Full name: Taichi Fukuyama
- Nickname: Taichi, Chitama
- Nationality: Japanese
- Born: 20 December 1993 (age 32); Kumamoto, Japan
- Height: 1.91 m (6 ft 3 in)
- Weight: 78 kg (172 lb)
- Spike: 335 cm (132 in)
- Block: 325 cm (128 in)
- Education: Waseda University

Volleyball information
- Position: Middle Blocker
- Current club: (Japan) JTEKT Stings
- Number: 4

Career
Years	Teams
2009–2012	(Japan) Chinzei High School
2012–2016	(Japan) Waseda University
2016–present	(Japan) JTEKT Stings

National team
2017	Japan universiade national team
2021	Japan senior national team
Medal record
Men's volleyball
Representing Japan
Asian Championship
Silver medal – second place	2021 Chiba/Funabashi	Team
Eastern Asian Championship
Gold medal – first place	2017 Ulaanbaatar	Team
Summer Universiade
Bronze medal – third place	2017 Taipei	Team

Taichi Fukuyama (福山 汰一, Fukuyama Taichi; born 20 December 1993) is a Japanese volleyball player. He currently plays for Japan national team and JTEKT Stings in V.League Division 1. He was the captain of the Waseda University volleyball club and the Japanese national team at the 2017 Eastern Asian Men's Volleyball Championship.

== International competition ==
- Japan universiade national team (2017)
  - 2017 Summer Universiade
- 2017 Eastern Asian Men's Volleyball Championship
- Japan men's national volleyball team (2021–present)
  - 2021 Asian Men's Volleyball Championship

== Awards ==
=== Individual ===
- 2020-21 V. League — Fair Play Award
- The 70th Kurowashiki All Japan Volleyball Tournament — Best 6

=== High school year ===
- 2010 All Japan High School Volleyball Championships — Runner-up, with Chinzei High School
- 2011 All Japan High School Volleyball Championships — Runner-up, with Chinzei High School

=== College year ===
- 2012 All Japan Intercollegiate Volleyball Championship — Bronze medal, with Waseda University
- 2013 All Japan Intercollegiate Volleyball Championship — Champion, with Waseda University
- 2015 All Japan Intercollegiate Volleyball Championship — Bronze medal, with Waseda University

=== Club teams ===
- 2018 Kurowashiki All Japan Volleyball Tournament — Runner-up, with JTEKT Stings
- 2019-20 V. League — Champion, with JTEKT Stings
- 2020 Emperor's Cup — Champion, with JTEKT Stings
- 2022 Emperor's Cup — Champion, with JTEKT Stings

== Personal life ==
On September 23, 2021, he announced that he was married.

== See also ==
- List of Waseda University people
- 《男子バレー》“苦労人”福山汰一（27）が名乗りを上げるミドルブロッカー争い…急成長の転機となった「ステップ」とは？ at Number (magazine)
