= Chen Longhai =

Chinese volleyball player (born 1991)

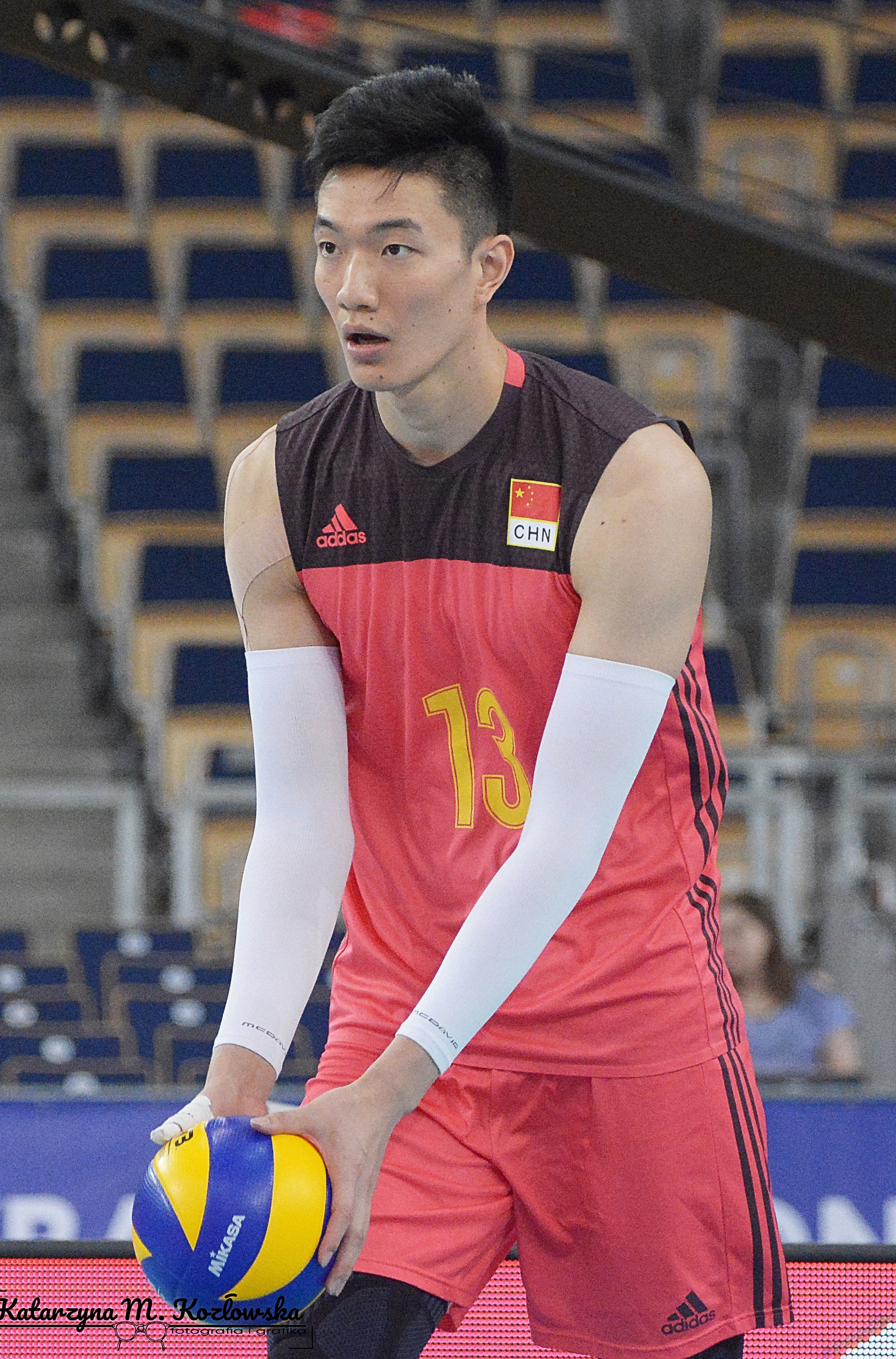

Personal information
- Nationality: Chinese
- Born: 29 March 1991 (age 35)
- Height: 2.01 m (6 ft 7 in)
- Weight: 85 kg (187 lb)
- Spike: 351 cm (138 in)
- Block: 340 cm (134 in)

Volleyball information
- Position: Middle Blocker
- Current club: (Japan) JTEKT Stings

National team
2014–present	China

Chen Longhai (born 29 March 1991) is a Chinese male volleyball player. He was part of the China men's national volleyball team at the 2014 FIVB Volleyball Men's World Championship in Poland. Currently, He plays for JTEKT Stings in Japanese league, V.League division 1.

== Clubs ==
- (China) Shanghai Golden Age (2009–2021)
- (Japan) JTEKT Stings (2021–present)
