= Hiroaki Asano =

Japanese volleyball player (born 1990)

Personal information
- Nationality: Japanese
- Born: 6 October 1990 (age 36); Azumino, Nagano, Japan
- Height: 178 cm (5 ft 10 in)
- Weight: 69 kg (152 lb)
- Spike: 335 cm (132 in)
- Block: 315 cm (124 in)

Volleyball information
- Position: Outside hitter

Career
Years	Teams
2012–2021	(Japan) JTEKT Stings

National team
2015–2019	Japan
Medal record
Men's volleyball
Representing Japan
Asian Championship
Gold medal – first place	2015 Tehran	Team

Hiroaki Asano (浅野 博亮, Asano Hiroaki; born 6 October 1990) is a retired Japanese male volleyball player. He used to be a part of the Japan men's national volleyball team. On club level, he only played for JTEKT Stings since 2012. On 9 April 2021, the club announced that he would retire after the 69th Kurowashiki All Japan Volleyball Tournament, but it was cancelled due to the COVID-19 pandemic.

== Awards ==
=== Club team ===
- 2012–13 V.Challenge League — Champion, with JTEKT Stings
- 2019–20 V. League 1 — Champion, with JTEKT Stings
- 2020–21 the Japanese Emperor's Cup — Champion, with JTEKT Stings
