= Rao Shuhan =

Chinese volleyball player (born 1996)

Personal information
- Nationality: Chinese
- Born: 23 December 1996 (age 29)
- Height: 209 cm (6 ft 10 in)
- Weight: 99 kg (218 lb)
- Spike: 345 cm (136 in)
- Block: 340 cm (134 in)

Volleyball information
- Position: Middle Blocker
- Current club: (China) Fujian VC
- Number: 20 (National Team)

Career
Years	Teams
2013–2018	(China) Fujian VC
2016–2018	(China) Shanghai Golden Age (loaned)
2018–2019	(China) Shanghai Golden Age
2019–2021	(Japan) JTEKT Stings
2021–present	(China) Fujian VC

National team
2015–present	China
Honours
Men's volleyball
Representing China
FIVB Challenger Cup
Gold medal – first place	2024 Linyi
- Last updated: June 3, 2021

Rao Shuhan (Chinese: 饶书涵, born 23 December 1996) is a Chinese male volleyball player. He is part of the China men's national volleyball team. On club level, he used to play for JTEKT Stings in Japanese highest league, V.League Division 1.

== Awards ==
- 2019–20 V. League – Best 6
