= NEC Blue Rockets =

Japanese volleyball club

- Founded: 1945
- Ground: NEC New Life Plaza; Fuchu city, Tokyo, Japan
- Manager Head coach: (Japan) Kuniaki Kimura (Japan) Minoru Takauchi
- League: V.Premier League
- 2008-09: 7th place
- Website: necsports.net/m Club home page

NEC Blue Rockets (NECブルーロケッツ, NEC Burū Rokettsu) was a men's volleyball team based in Fuchu, Tokyo, Japan, that played in the V.Premier League. The owner of the club is NEC.

== History ==
The club was founded in 1938 and disbanded in 2009.

== Honours ==
Japan Volleyball League/V.League/V.Premier League

- Champion (4): 1991, 1993, 1995 and 1998
- Runners-up (4): 1989, 1992, 1997 and 2004

Kurowashiki All Japan Volleyball Tournament

- Champions (7): 1992, 1994, 1994, 1997, 1999, 2003 and 2007
- Runners-up (1): 2005

Emperor's Cup

- Champion (0):

== League results ==
League		Position	Teams	Matches	Win	Lose
V.League	1st (1994–95)	3rd	8	21	14	7
V.League	2nd (1995–96)	Champion	8	21	15	6
V.League	3rd (1996–97)	3rd	8	21	14	7
V.League	4th (1997–98)	Runner-up	8	21	12	9
V.League	5th (1998–99)	Champion	10	18	12	6
V.League	6th (1999-00)	3rd	10	18	14	4
V.League	7th (2000–01)	4th	10	18	13	5
V.League	8th (2001–02)	4th	10	18	14	4
V.League	9th (2002–03)	4th	8	21	16	5
V.League	10th (2003–04)	5th	8	21	10	11
V.League	11th (2004–05)	Runner-up	8	28	15	13
V.League	12th (2005–06)	3rd	8	28	18	10
V・Premier	2006-07	7th	8	28	9	19
V・Premier	2007-08	7th	8	28	9	19
V・Premier	2008-09	7th	8	28	11	17
