= Tine Urnaut =

Slovenian volleyball player (born 1988)

Tine Urnaut OLY
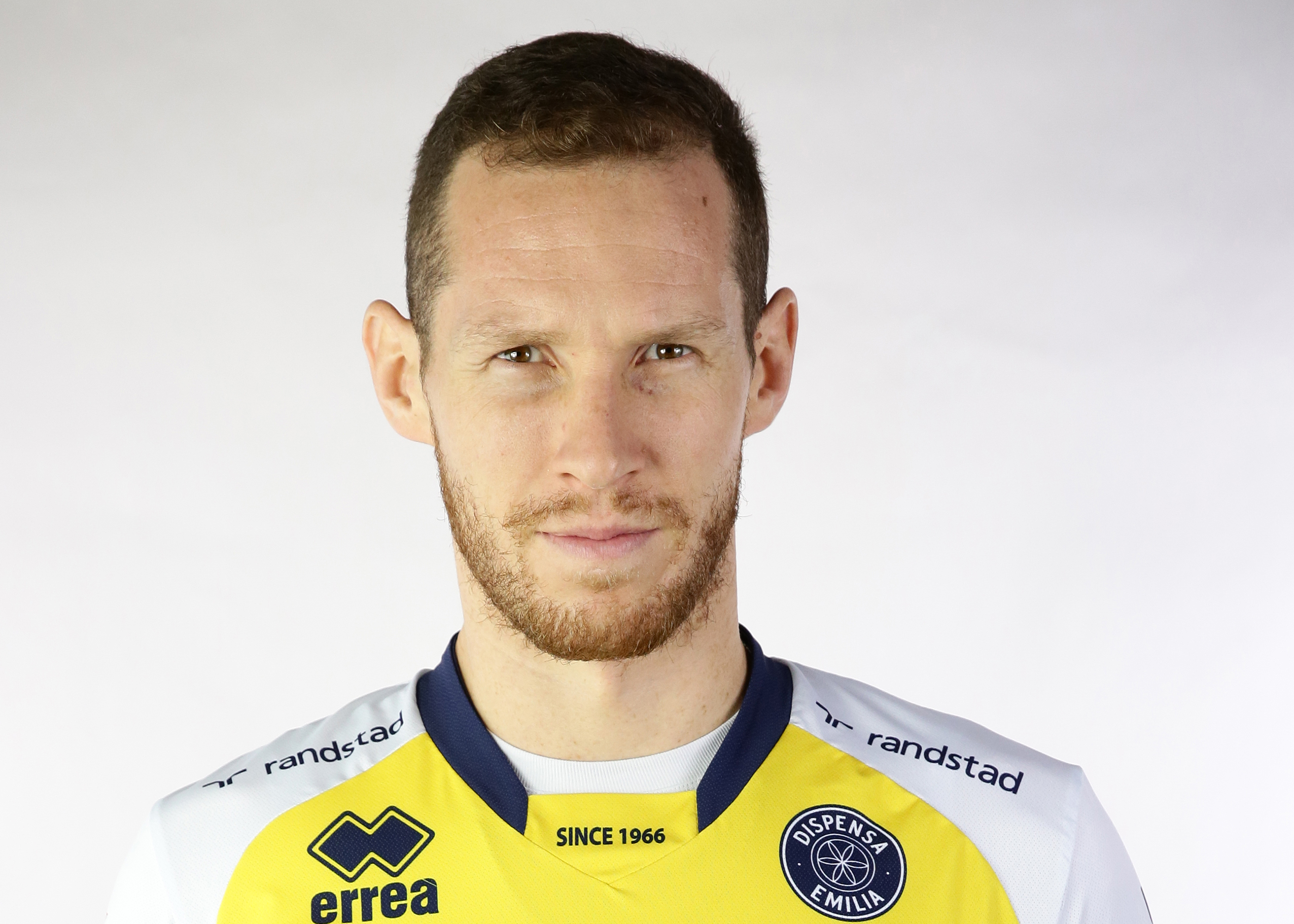
- Urnaut in 2019

Personal information
- Nationality: Slovenian
- Born: 3 September 1988 (age 38) Slovenj Gradec, Yugoslavia
- Height: 2.00 m (6 ft 7 in)
- Weight: 90 kg (198 lb)
- Spike: 365 cm (144 in)
- Block: 345 cm (136 in)

Volleyball information
- Position: Outside hitter / opposite
- Current club: ACH Volley

Career
- Years: Team
- 2006–2008 2008–2009 2009–2010 2010–2011 2011–2012 2012–2013 2013–2014 2014–2015 2015–2016 2016 2017–2019 2018 2019–2020 2020–2021 2021–2022 2022–2024 2024–2025 2025 2025–: ACH Volley; Olympiacos Piraeus; CoprAtlantide Piacenza; ZAKSA Kędzierzyn-Koźle; Umbria Volley; Volley Callipo; Arkas İzmir; Top Volley Latina; Diatec Trentino; Al Rayyan; Modena Volley; Al Ahli Doha; Shanghai Golden Age; Allianz Milano; Zenit Saint Petersburg; JTEKT Stings; Wolfdogs Nagoya; Al Rayyan; ACH Volley

National team
- Years: Team
- 2006–: Slovenia
Honours
Men's volleyball
Representing Slovenia
FIVB Nations League
Bronze medal – third place	2026 China
FIVB Challenger Cup
Gold medal – first place	2019 Slovenia
CEV European Championship
Silver medal – second place	2015 Bulgaria/Italy
Silver medal – second place	2019 France/Slovenia/Belgium/Netherlands
Silver medal – second place	2021 Poland/Czech Republic/Estonia/Finland
Bronze medal – third place	2023 Italy/Bulgaria/North Macedonia/Israel
European League
Gold medal – first place	2015 Poland
Bronze medal – third place	2011 Slovakia
Mediterranean Games
Bronze medal – third place	2009 Pescara

Tine Urnaut (born 3 September 1988) is a Slovenian volleyball player who plays for ACH Volley and the Slovenia national team. With Slovenia, he was the runner-up of the European Volleyball Championship three times, in 2015, 2019 and 2021.

== Career ==
=== National team ===
In August 2015, Urnaut won the gold medal with Slovenia in the 2015 European League. He was also the runner-up of the 2015 European Championship, where Slovenia lost 3–0 against France in the final. Urnaut received an individual award for the Best Outside Spiker of the tournament.

He represented Slovenia at the 2024 Summer Olympics.

== Honours ==
ACH Volley

- CEV Cup: 2006–07
- Slovenian Championship: 2006–07, 2007–08

Olympiacos Piraeus

- Greek Championship: 2008–09

ZAKSA Kędzierzyn-Koźle

- CEV Cup runner-up: 2010–11

Diatec Trentino

- CEV Champions League runner-up: 2015–16
- CEV Cup runner-up: 2016–17

Allianz Powervolley Milano

- CEV Challenge Cup: 2020–21

JTEKT Stings

- Emperor's Cup and Empress' Cup All Japan Volleyball Championship: 2022

Al Rayyan

- AVC Champions League: 2025

Individual

- Men's European Volleyball Championship Best Outside Spiker: 2015
- CEV Champions League Best Outside Spiker: 2016
