= Michał Mieszko Gogol =

Polish volleyball player and coach

Personal information
- Born: 23 April 1985 (age 41); Szczecin, Poland

Coaching information
Previous teams coached
Years	Teams
2008–2011; 2011–2016; 2016; 2016–2018; 2018–2021; 2018–2019; 2019–2021; 2021–2024; 2022; 2023–2025	AZS Częstochowa (AC); Asseco Resovia (S); Stocznia Szczecin (AC); Stocznia Szczecin; Poland (AC); AZS Olsztyn; Skra Bełchatów; Latvia; Germany (W) (AC); JTEKT Stings

Volleyball information
- Position: Setter

Michał Mieszko Gogol (born 23 April 1985) is a Polish professional volleyball coach and former player. He serves as sports director for JTEKT Stings.
