= JTEKT Stings =

Japanese volleyball club

JTEKT Stings Aichi
- Founded: 1958; 68 years ago
- Ground: Kariya, Aichi, Japan
- Head coach: Michał Mieszko Gogol
- Captain: Ryuta Homma
- League: SV.League
- 2025–26: 3rd place
- Website: Club home page
- Championships: 1

JTEKT Stings Aichi (ジェイテクトSTINGS愛知, Jeitekuto STINGS Aichi) is a men's volleyball team based in the city of Kariya, Japan. It competes in the V.League, the highest volleyball league in Japan. The club was founded in 1958 and the current owner of the club is JTEKT.

== History ==
JTEKT Stings was founded as Toyoda Kōki volleyball club in 1958.

The club was promoted to V1 League (later renamed the Challenge League) in 2002. The club was renamed the JTEKT Stings in 2006. In 2010, the club won the Challenge League for the first time. In 2013, the club was promoted to V.Premier League (later was changed to V.League division 1), the highest league in Japan, after beating Oita Miyoshi Weisse Adler. In 2020, the club won V.League division 1 title in Season 2019/20 for the first time in club's history.

JTEKT Stings won their second title of Emperor's Cup in 2022. To celebrate the 10th anniversary of their entry into the V.League Division 1, they wore a limited edition 10th anniversary uniform featuring red and Mizuno's original blue.

== Honours ==
SV.League

- Runners-up (1): 2024-25

V.League 1 (Highest league)

- Champion(1): 2019–20

V1 League/V.Challenge League

- Champions(3): 2009–10, 2010–11 and 2012–13
- Runners-up(1): 2011–12

Japanese Emperor's Cup

- Champions(1): 2020, 2022
- Runners-up(1): 2013

== Team ==
=== Current roster ===
The following is team roster of 2026/27 SV.League as of November 2026

| No. | Player Name | Date of birth | Position | Height |
|---|---|---|---|---|
| 1 | (Japan) Yuto Fujinaka | April 20, 1996 (age 30) | Outside Hitter | 1.82 m (6 ft 0 in) |
| 2 | (Japan) Kentaro Takahashi | February 8, 1995 (age 31) | Middle Blocker | 2.01 m (6 ft 7 in) |
| 3 | (Japan) Sayato Sakai | November 26, 2002 (age 23) | Middle Blocker | 1.96 m (6 ft 5 in) |
| 4 | (Japan) Shuto Kawaguchi | August 9, 2000 (age 26) | Middle Blocker | 2.00 m (6 ft 7 in) |
| 6 | (Japan) Yudai Kawahigashi | February 7, 1998 (age 28) | Setter | 1.75 m (5 ft 9 in) |
| 7 | (Japan) Takuma Araki | July 16, 2002 (age 24) | Libero | 1.65 m (5 ft 5 in) |
| 9 | (France) Stephen Boyer | April 10, 1996 (age 30) | Opposite Hitter | 1.96 m (6 ft 5 in) |
| 10 | (Japan) Kenya Fujinaka | July 25, 1993 (age 33) | Outside Hitter | 1.88 m (6 ft 2 in) |
| 11 | (Brazil) Nunes Judson | December 5, 1998 (age 27) | Middle Blocker | 2.05 m (6 ft 9 in) |
| 12 | (Japan) Naoya Fujiwara | December 24, 2001 (age 24) | Outside Hitter | 1.92 m (6 ft 4 in) |
| 16 | (Japan) Mitsuki Demizu | December 22, 2003 (age 22) | Outside Hitter | 1.98 m (6 ft 6 in) |
| 17 | (Japan) Issei Maeda | September 22, 1991 (age 35) | Setter | 1.82 m (6 ft 0 in) |
| 21 | (Japan) Kazuyuki Takahashi (c) | January 26, 2000 (age 26) | Libero | 1.70 m (5 ft 7 in) |
| 22 | (Japan) Daigo Iwamoto | February 10, 2001 (age 25) | Middle Blocker | 1.93 m (6 ft 4 in) |
| 23 | (United States) Torey Defalco | April 10, 1997 (age 29) | Outside Hitter | 1.98 m (6 ft 6 in) |
| 24 | (Japan) Keihan Takahashi | October 13, 2003 (age 23) | Opposite Hitter | 1.94 m (6 ft 4 in) |
Head coach: (Japan) Koichiro Shimbo

=== Former rosters ===
Team roster – season 2023/24
| No. | Player Name | Date of birth | Position |
|---|---|---|---|
| 1 | (Japan) Yuto Fujinaka | April 20, 1996 (age 30) | Outside hitter |
| 3 | (Japan) Dai Tezuka | November 18, 1988 (age 37) | Outside hitter |
| 4 | (Japan) Taichi Fukuyama | February 7, 1993 (age 33) | Middle blocker |
| 5 | (China) Rao Shuhan | December 23, 1996 | Middle blocker |
| 6 | (Japan) Kawahigashi Yudai | June 19, 1998 (age 28) | Setter |
| 8 | (Japan) Masahiro Sekita | November 20, 1993 (age 32) | Setter |
| 9 | (Japan) Go Murayama | July 30, 1998 (age 28) | Middle blocker |
| 10 | (Slovenia) Tine Urnaut | September 3, 1988 (age 38) | Outside hitter |
| 11 | (Japan) Kosuke Hata | July 15, 1995 (age 31) | Outside Hitter |
| 17 | (Japan) Ryuta Homma (c) | October 17, 1991 (age 35) | Libero |
| 18 | (Japan) Junpei Michii | November 19, 1997 (age 28) | Setter |
| 20 | (Japan) Jin Tsuzuki | December 28, 1998 (age 27) | Outside hitter |
| 21 | (Japan) Kazuyuki Takahashi | January 26, 2000 (age 26) | Libero |
| 22 | (Japan) Daigo Iwamoto | February 10, 2001 (age 25) | Middle blocker |
| 23 | (Japan) Shunichiro Sato | May 17, 2000 (age 26) | Middle blocker |
Head coach: (Poland) Michał Gogol

Team roster – season 2022/23
| No. | Player Name | Date of birth | Position |
|---|---|---|---|
| 1 | (Japan) Yuto Fujinaka | April 20, 1996 (age 30) | Outside hitter |
| 2 | (Japan) Akitomo Kanamaru | March 4, 1984 (age 42) | Middle blocker |
| 3 | (China) Chen Longhai | March 29, 1991 (age 35) | Middle blocker |
| 4 | (Japan) Taichi Fukuyama | February 7, 1993 (age 33) | Middle blocker |
| 6 | (Japan) Kawahigashi Yudai | June 19, 1998 (age 28) | Setter |
| 7 | (Japan) Kouhei Yanagisawa | May 24, 1993 (age 33) | Outside hitter |
| 8 | (Japan) Masahiro Yanagida | July 6, 1992 (age 34) | Outside hitter |
| 9 | (Japan) Go Murayama | July 30, 1998 (age 28) | Middle blocker |
| 10 | (Slovenia) Tine Urnaut | September 3, 1988 (age 38) | Outside hitter |
| 11 | (Japan) Ryosuke Hakamaya | November 1, 1988 (age 38) | Opposite spiker |
| 12 | (Japan) Masahiro Sekita | November 20, 1993 (age 32) | Setter |
| 14 | (Japan) Yuji Nishida | January 30, 2000 (age 26) | Opposite spiker |
| 17 | (Japan) Ryuta Homma (c) | October 17, 1991 (age 35) | Libero |
| 18 | (Japan) Junpei Michii | November 19, 1997 (age 28) | Setter |
| 20 | (Japan) Jin Tsuzuki | December 28, 1998 (age 27) | Outside hitter |
| 21 | (Japan) Kazuyuki Takahashi | January 26, 2000 (age 26) | Libero |
| 22 | (Japan) Daigo Iwamoto In | February 10, 2001 (age 25) | Middle blocker |
| 23 | (Japan) Shunichiro Sato In | May 17, 2000 (age 26) | Middle blocker |
Head coach: (Italy) Federico Fagiani

Team roster – season 2021/22
| No. | Player Name | Date of birth | Position | |
|---|---|---|---|---|
| 1 | (Japan) Yuto Fujinaka | April 20, 1996 (age 30) | Outside hitter | |
| 2 | (Japan) Akitomo Kanamaru | March 4, 1984 (age 42) | Middle blocker | |
| 3 | (China) Chen Longhai | March 29, 1991 (age 35) | Middle blocker | New player |
| 4 | (Japan) Taichi Fukuyama | December 20, 1993 (age 32) | Middle blocker | Deputy Captain |
| 6 | (Brazil) Luiz Felipe Fonteles | June 19, 1984 (age 42) | Outside hitter | |
| 7 | (Japan) Kouhei Yanagisawa | May 24, 1993 (age 33) | Outside hitter | |
| 8 | (Japan) Hiroya Kori | February 6, 1996 (age 30) | Outside hitter | |
| 9 | (Japan) Go Murayama | July 30, 1998 (age 28) | Middle blocker | |
| 10 | (Japan) Mitsuki Kobayashi | May 10, 1997 (age 29) | Setter | |
| 11 | (Japan) Ryosuke Hakamaya | November 1, 1988 (age 38) | Opposite spiker | |
| 12 | (Japan) Ryo Kohrogi | August 14, 1983 (age 43) | Libero | |
| 15 | (Japan) Kento Miyaura | February 22, 1999 (age 27) | Opposite spiker | Rookie |
| 16 | (Japan) Sho Kuboyama | February 4, 1992 (age 34) | Setter | |
| 17 | (Japan) Ryuta Homma | October 17, 1991 (age 35) | Libero | Captain |
| 18 | (Japan) Junpei Michii | November 19, 1997 (age 28) | Setter | |
| 20 | (Japan) Jin Tsuzuki | December 28, 1998 (age 27) | Outside hitter | Rookie |
Head coach: (Italy) Federico Fagiani

Team roster – season 2020/21
| No. | Player Name | Date of birth | Position |
|---|---|---|---|
| 1 | (Japan) Yuto Fujinaka | April 20, 1996 | Outside hitter |
| 2 | (Japan) Akitomo Kanamaru | March 4, 1984 | Middle blocker |
| 3 | (Japan) Yamato Fushimi | December 24, 1991 | Middle blocker |
| 4 | (Japan) Taichi Fukuyama | December 20, 1993 | Middle blocker |
| 5 | (China) Rao Shuhan | December 23, 1996 | Middle blocker |
| 6 | (Brazil) Luiz Felipe Fonteles | June 19, 1984 | Outside hitter |
| 7 | (Japan) Kouhei Yanagisawa | May 24, 1993 | Outside hitter |
| 8 | (Japan) Hiroya Kori | February 6, 1996 | Outside hitter |
| 9 | (Japan) Go Murayama | July 30, 1998 | Middle blocker |
| 10 | (Japan) Mitsuki Kobayashi | May 10, 1997 | Setter |
| 11 | (Japan) Ryosuke Hakamaya | November 1, 1988 | Opposite spiker |
| 12 | (Japan) Ryo Kohrogi | August 14, 1983 | Libero |
| 14 | (Japan) Yuji Nishida | January 30, 2000 | Opposite spiker |
| 15 | (Japan) Kento Miyaura | February 22, 1999 | Opposite spiker |
| 16 | (Japan) Sho Kuboyama | February 4, 1992 | Setter |
| 17 | (Japan) Ryuta Homma (c) | October 17, 1991 | Libero |
| 18 | (Japan) Junpei Michii | November 19, 1997 | Setter |
| 19 | (Japan) Hiroaki Asano | June 10, 1990 | Outside hitter |
| 20 | (Japan) Jin Tsuzuki | December 28, 1998 | Outside hitter |
Head coach: (Japan) Shinji Takahashi; Assistant: (Italy) Federico Fagiani

Team roster – season 2019/20
| No. | Player Name | Date of birth | Position |
|---|---|---|---|
| 1 | (Japan) Yuto Fujinaka | April 20, 1996 | Outside hitter |
| 2 | (Japan) Akitomo Kanamaru | March 4, 1984 | Middle blocker |
| 3 | (Japan) Yamato Fushimi | December 24, 1991 | Middle blocker |
| 4 | (Japan) Taichi Fukuyama | December 20, 1993 | Middle blocker |
| 5 | (China) Rao Shuhan | December 23, 1996 | Middle blocker New player |
| 6 | (Bulgaria) Matey Kaziyski | September 23, 1984 | Outside hitter |
| 7 | (Japan) Kouhei Yanagisawa | May 24, 1993 | Outside hitter |
| 8 | (Japan) Hiroya Kori | February 6, 1996 | Outside hitter |
| 9 | (Japan) Masatoshi Tatsumi | January 9, 1989 | Middle blocker |
| 10 | (Japan) Mitsuki Kobayashi | May 10, 1997 | Setter |
| 11 | (Japan) Ryosuke Hakamaya | November 1, 1988 | Opposite spiker |
| 12 | (Japan) Ryo Kohrogi | August 14, 1983 | Libero |
| 14 | (Japan) Yuji Nishida | January 30, 2000 | Opposite spiker |
| 15 | (Japan) Souta Nakane | March 2, 1996 | Setter |
| 16 | (Japan) Sho Kuboyama | February 4, 1992 | Setter |
| 17 | (Japan) Ryuta Homma (c) | October 17, 1991 | Libero |
| 18 | (Japan) Junpei Michii | November 19, 1997 | Setter |
| 19 | (Japan) Hiroaki Asano | June 10, 1990 | Outside hitter |
Head coach: (Japan) Shinji Takahashi; Assistant: (Italy) Federico Fagiani

== Notable players ==
- (Venezuela) Ernardo Gómez (2006–2007)
- (Cuba) Fernando Hernández (2013–2015)
- (Bulgaria) Valentin Bratoev (2018–2019)
- (Japan) Hiroaki Asano (2012–2021)
- (Bulgaria) Matey Kaziyski (2015–2018, 2019–2020)
- (Japan) Yuji Nishida (2017–2021, 2022–2023)
- (Japan) Yamato Fushimi (2019–2021)
- (China) Rao Shuhan (2019–2021)
- (Brazil) Luiz Felipe Fonteles (2020–2022)
- (Japan) Masahiro Yanagida (2022–2023)
- (Japan) Masahiro Sekita (2022–2025)

== League results ==
Champions Runners-up

| League | | Position | Teams | Matches | Win | Lose |
|---|---|---|---|---|---|---|
| V.League | 5th (2002–03) | 5th | 8 | 14 | 7 | 7 |
| V.League | 6th (2003–04) | 5th | 7 | 12 | 5 | 7 |
| V.League | 7th (2004–05) | 6th | 8 | 14 | 7 | 7 |
| V.League | 8th (2005–06) | 4th | 8 | 14 | 8 | 6 |
| V・Challenge League | 2006-07 | 3rd | 9 | 16 | 12 | 4 |
| V・Challenge League | 2007-08 | 5th | 10 | 18 | 11 | 7 |
| V・Challenge League | 2008-09 | 3rd | 12 | 18 | 14 | 4 |
| V・Challenge League | 2009-10 | Champion | 11 | 15 | 15 | 0 |
| V・Challenge League | 2010-11 | Champion | 11 | 16 | 15 | 1 |
| V・Challenge League | 2011-12 | Runner-Up | 11 | 15 | 13 | 2 |
| V・Challenge League | 2012-13 | Champion | 11 | 20 | 18 | 2 |
| V・Premier League | 2013-14 | 8th | 8 | 28 | 6 | 22 |
| V・Premier League | 2014-15 | 5th | 8 | 21 | 9 | 12 |
| V・Premier League | 2015-16 | 4th | 8 | 21 | 12 | 9 |
| V・Premier League | 2016-17 | 3rd | 8 | 21 | 9 | 12 |
| V・Premier League | 2017-18 | 5th | 8 | 21 | 8 | 13 |
| V・League Division 1 | 2018–19 | 7th | 10 | 27 | 13 | 14 |
| V・League Division 1 | 2019–20 | Champion | 10 | 29 | 25 | 4 |
| V・League Division 1 | 2020–21 | 4th | 10 | 34 | 23 | 11 |
| V・League Division 1 | 2021–22 | 7th | 10 | 36 | 15 | 21 |
| V・League Division 1 | 2022–23 | 6th | 10 | 36 | 22 | 14 |
| SV.League | 2024-25 | 4th | 10 | 44 | 28 | 16 |
| SV.League | 2025-26 | 3rd | 10 | 44 | 29 | 15 |
