= Matsumoto City Gymnasium =

Indoor sporting arena in Matsumoto, Nagano, Japan

- Matsumoto City Gymnasium
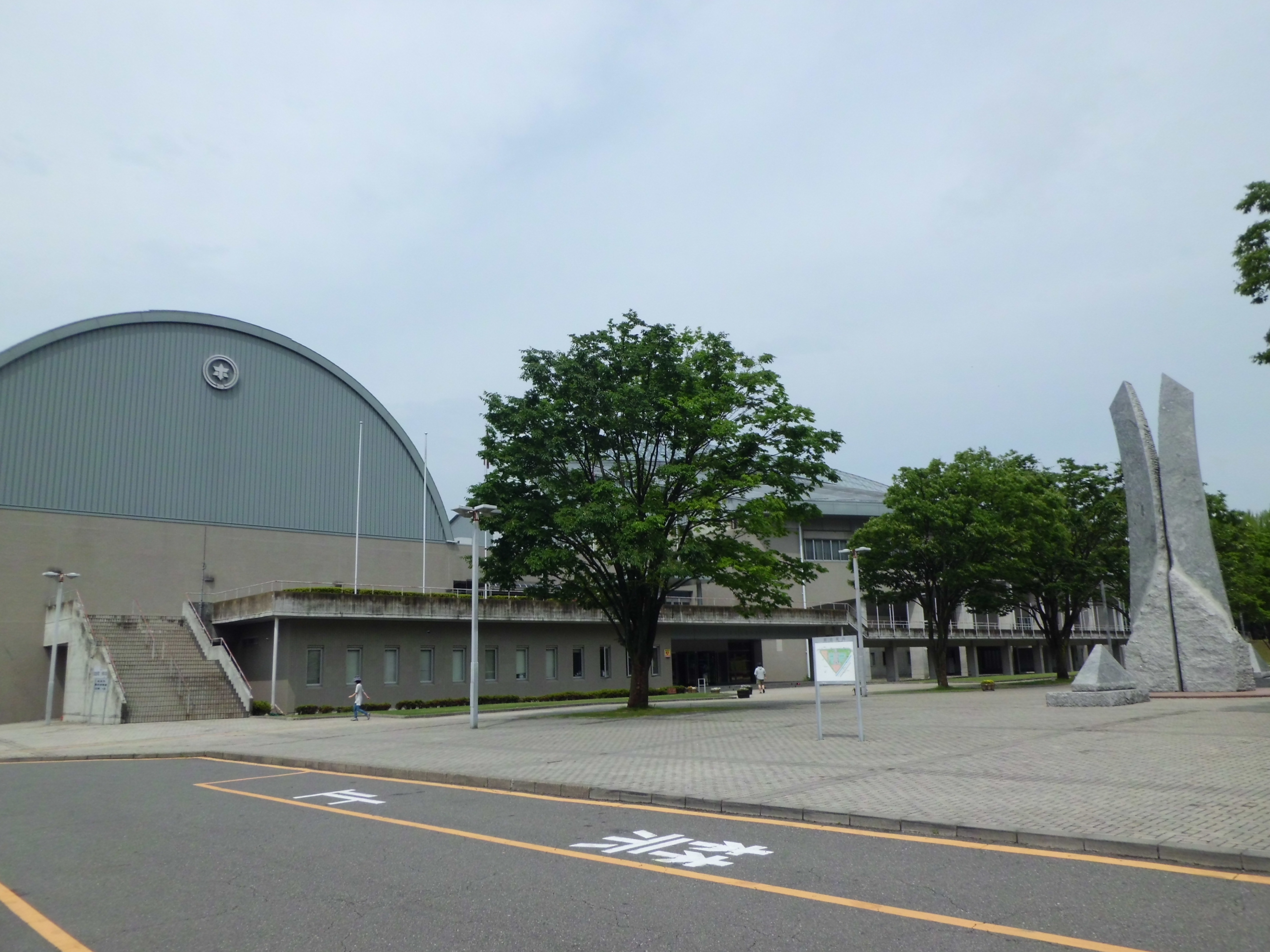
- Interactive map of Matsumoto City Gymnasium
- Full name: Matsumoto City Gymnasium
- Location: Matsumoto, Japan
- Coordinates: 36.256771°N 137.980686°E
- Owner: Matsumoto
- Operator: Matsumoto
- Capacity: 6,000

Construction
- Groundbreaking: 1991

Matsumoto City Gymnasium is an indoor sporting arena located in Matsumoto, Japan. The capacity of the arena is 6,000 spectators. It was one of the host cities of the official 2010 Women's Volleyball World Championship. It also hosted some of the volleyball events at the 2007 FIVB Men's World Cup.

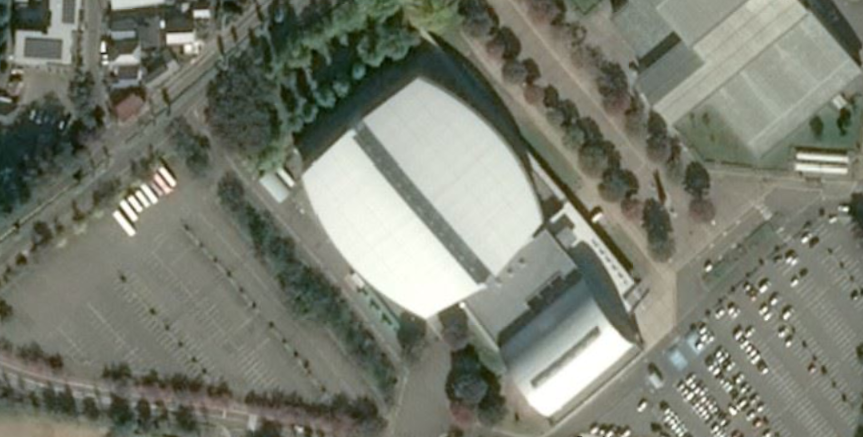
Satellite view
