= Emperor's Cup and Empress' Cup All Japan Volleyball Championship =

Japanese volleyball competition

- Most recent season or competition: 2022 Emperor's Cup and Empress' Cup All Japan Volleyball Championship
- Sport: Volleyball
- Founded: 2007; 19 years ago
- Organising body: Japan Volleyball Association (JVA)
- No. of teams: 24 (Final round)
- Country: Japan
- Most recent champions: Men: JTEKT Stings (2022); Women: NEC Red Rockets (2022)
- Most titles: Men:Panasonic Panthers (4); Women:Hisamitsu Springs (8)
- Streaming partner: NTTSportict
- Related competitions: V.League
- Website: Emperor's Cup and Empress' Cup website (JVA)

Emperor's Cup and Empress' Cup All Japan Volleyball Championship (天皇杯・皇后杯全日本バレーボール選手権大会, Tennōhai Kōgōhai Zen Nippon Volleyball Senshuken Taikai) is a Japanese volleyball competition that was established in 2007. It is organized by the Japan Volleyball Association.

The word Tennō (天皇) means the Emperor of Japan, and the term Kōgō (皇后) is the Empress of Japan. The Tennō Kōgō Commemorative Cup is given to the champion of the tournament. The Commemorative Cup was given to the winner of the Kurowashiki All Japan Volleyball Championship until 2006.

== Champions ==
Year	Men	Women
2007	JT Thunders	Toray Arrows
2008	Toray Arrows	Toyota Auto Body Queenseis
2009	Panasonic Panthers	Hisamitsu Springs
2010	Suntory Sunbirds	Denso Airybees
2011	Panasonic Panthers	Toray Arrows
2012	Panasonic Panthers	Hisamitsu Springs
2013	Toray Arrows	Hisamitsu Springs
2014	JT Thunders	Hisamitsu Springs
2015	Toyoda Gosei	Hisamitsu Springs
2016	Toray Arrows	Hisamitsu Springs
2017	Panasonic Panthers	Toyota Auto Body Queenseis
2018	JT Thunders	Hisamitsu Springs
2019	Tournament cancelled due to COVID-19 pandemic	
2020	JTEKT Stings	JT Marvelous
2021	Wolfdogs Nagoya	Hisamitsu Springs
2022	JTEKT Stings	NEC Red Rockets
2023	Panasonic Panthers	NEC Red Rockets
2024	Suntory Sunbirds	Victorina Himeji
2025	Wolfdogs Nagoya	Osaka Marvelous

== MVP by edition ==
From the 2021 edition, the MVP Award has been created. The prize money for the MVP award is JP¥100,000.

Year	Men	Women
2021	(Poland) Bartosz Kurek	(Japan) Arisa Inoue
2022	(Japan) Masahiro Yanagida	(Japan) Sarina Koga
2023	(Japan) Yuji Nishida	(Japan) Sarina Koga
2024	(Japan) Ran Takahashi	(Japan) Arisa Inoue
2025	(Japan) Kento Miyaura	(Japan) Mizuki Tanaka

== Prize money ==
- The winner: JP¥10,000,000
- Runner-up: JP¥4,000,000.

Capcom Award

As Capcom signed 3 year partnership contract with JVA, Capcom Award was established for the winner. Another ten million Japan Yen (JP¥10,000,000) per gender will be given for three consecutive years starting in 2022. It makes the Emperor's Cup and Empress' Cup All Japan Volleyball Championship become the highest endowed tournament in Japan.
