= V.League (Japan) =

Second-level professional volleyball league in Japan

J.V League
- Current season, competition or edition: 2024–25 V.League Division 1 Men's; 2024–25 V.League Division 1 Women's
- Sport: Volleyball
- Founded: 1994; 32 years ago
- No. of teams: Men: 18; Women: 11
- Country: Japan
- Most recent champions: Men: Suntory Sunbirds (10th title); Women: NEC Red Rockets (9th title) (2023–24)
- Most titles: Men: Shin Nihon Steel (16 titles) (later; Osaka Blazers Sakai); Women: Hitachi (17 titles)
- Broadcaster: V.TV by Easy sports
- Related competitions: SV.League
- Website: vleague.jp (Men Women)

The V.League (Japanese: Vリーグ) is the second-level professional volleyball league for both men and women in Japan. The league started in 1994.

The competitions are organized by the Japan Volleyball League Organization. The league was called V.Premier League before the reform took place in 2018. The SV.League succeeded the V.League as the premier volleyball tournament in Japan in 2024.

== History ==
=== V.League ===
In 2016, the Japan Volleyball League Organization, which hosts Premier League, held a press conference in Tokyo and announced plans to create a new league and aim for professionalization. They plan to recruit participating teams by the end of November and aim to start in the fall of 2018.

This project to create a new league was called NEW BORN V.LEAGUE. The new league was named V.League. The new V.League aims to promote the "sports business" of volleyball by realizing a system of "earning through sports and returning the profits to sports" without being bound by conventional concepts. In addition, the V.League aims to further enhance the value of volleyball, push volleyball up to Japan's top arena sports, connect with the world, and become the world's best volleyball league.

=== Creation of SV.League ===
The Japan Volleyball League Organization created the SV.League as the newest top-flight volleyball organization in Japan, placing it above the V.League.

For teams that do not wish to join the SV.League, both men's and women's leagues will be unified into one division under the name of V.League. The East-West Conference system will be introduced.

== Clubs ==
This is the list of participating clubs in 2024–25 season.

=== Men ===
The men's clubs in 2024–25 season
No.	Region	Club
1	East	Hokkaido Yellow Stars
2	East	Tsukuba United Sun GAIA
3	East	Reve's Tochigi
4	East	Saitama Azalea
5	East	Chiba Zelva
6	East	Tokyo Verdy
7	East	Fujitsu Kawasaki Red Spirits
8	East	Nagano GaRons
9	West	Aisin Tealmare Hekinan
10	West	Daido Steel Chita Red Star
11	West	Veertien Mie
12	West	Kinki Club Sfida
13	West	Kubota Spears Osaka
14	West	Kinden Trinity Blitz
15	West	Hyogo Delfino
16	West	Nara Dreamers
17	West	Fukuoka Winning Spirits
18	West	Fragolad Kagoshima

=== Women ===
The women's clubs in 2024–25 season
No.	Club
1	Artemis Hokkaido
2	Ligare Sendai
3	Tokyo Sunbeams
4	Shinshu Brilliant Aries
5	Ja Gifu Rioreina
6	Breath Hamamatsu
7	Veertien Mie
8	Kurashiki Ablaze
9	Hiroshima Oilers
10	Kanoa Laulea's Fukuoka
11	Forest Leaves Kumamoto

== Previous winners ==
- 1967–68 to 1993–94: Japan Volleyball League
- 1994–95 to 2005–06: V League
- 2006–07 to 2017–18: V.Premier League
- 2018–19 to 2023–24: V.League Division 1

=== Men ===
Japan Volleyball League
Season	Winners
1967–68	Yahata Steel
1968–69	Nihon Koukan
1969–70	Nihon Koukan
1970–71	Nihon Koukan
1971–72	Matsushita Denki
1972–73	Nihon Koukan
1973–74	Shin Nihon Steel
1974–75	Shin Nihon Steel
1975–76	Shin Nihon Steel
1976–77	Shin Nihon Steel
1977–78	Nihon Koukan
1978–79	Shin Nihon Steel
1979–80	Shin Nihon Steel
1980–81	Shin Nihon Steel
1981–82	Fuji Photo Film
1982–83	Shin Nihon Steel
1983–84	Fuji Photo Film
1984–85	Fuji Photo Film
1985–86	Fuji Photo Film
1986–87	Fuji Photo Film
1987–88	Fuji Photo Film
1988–89	Shin Nihon Steel
1989–90	Shin Nihon Steel
1990–91	Shin Nihon Steel
1991–92	NEC Blue Rockets
1992–93	Fuji Photo Film
1993–94	NEC Blue Rockets

V League
Season	Winners
1994–95	Suntory Sunbirds
1995–96	NEC Blue Rockets
1996–97	Osaka Blazers Sakai
1997–98	Osaka Blazers Sakai
1998–99	NEC Blue Rockets
1999-00	Suntory Sunbirds
2000–01	Suntory Sunbirds
2001–02	Suntory Sunbirds
2002–03	Suntory Sunbirds
2003–04	Suntory Sunbirds
2004–05	Toray Arrows
2005–06	Osaka Blazers Sakai

V.Premier League
Season	Winners
2006–07	Suntory Sunbirds
2007–08	Panasonic Panthers
2008–09	Toray Arrows
2009–10	Panasonic Panthers
2010–11	Osaka Blazers Sakai
2011–12	Panasonic Panthers
2012–13	Osaka Blazers Sakai
2013–14	Panasonic Panthers
2014–15	JT Thunders
2015–16	Toyoda Gosei Trefuerza
2016–17	Toray Arrows
2017–18	Panasonic Panthers

V.League Division 1
Season	Winners
2018–19	Panasonic Panthers
2019–20	JTEKT Stings
2020–21	Suntory Sunbirds
2021–22	Suntory Sunbirds
2022–23	Wolfdogs Nagoya
2023–24	Suntory Sunbirds

=== Women ===
Season	Winners
1967–68	Hitachi Musashi
1968–69	Unitika Kaizuka
1969–70	Unitika Kaizuka
1970–71	Unitika Kaizuka
1971–72	Unitika Kaizuka
1972–73	Yashika
1973–74	Hitachi Musashi
1974–75	Hitachi Musashi
1975–76	Hitachi
1976–77	Hitachi
1977–78	Hitachi
1978–79	Kanebo
1979–80	Unitika
1980–81	Unitika
1981–82	Hitachi
1982–83	Hitachi
1983–84	Hitachi
1984–85	Hitachi
1985–86	Hitachi
1986–87	Hitachi
1987–88	NEC
1988–89	Hitachi
1989–90	Ito Yokado
1990–91	Hitachi
1991–92	Hitachi
1992–93	Hitachi
1993–94	Hitachi

Season	Winners
1994–95	Daiei
1995–96	Unitika
1996–97	NEC Red Rockets
1997–98	Daiei
1998–99	Toyobo
1999-00	NEC Red Rockets
2000–01	Toyobo
2001–02	Hisamitsu Springs
2002–03	NEC Red Rockets
2003–04	Pioneer Red Wings
2004–05	NEC Red Rockets
2005–06	Pioneer Red Wings
2006–07	Hisamitsu Springs
2007–08	Toray Arrows
2008–09	Toray Arrows
2009–10	Toray Arrows
2010–11	JT Marvelous
2011–12	Toray Arrows
2012–13	Hisamitsu Springs
2013–14	Hisamitsu Springs
2014–15	NEC Red Rockets
2015–16	Hisamitsu Springs
2016–17	NEC Red Rockets
2017–18	Hisamitsu Springs
2018–19	Hisamitsu Springs
2019–20	JT Marvelous
2020–21	JT Marvelous
2021–22	Hisamitsu Springs
2022–23	NEC Red Rockets
2023–24	NEC Red Rockets

== Spectators ==
Records show from the new born V.League Division 1 from Season 2018/19.

Season	Men (Division 1)	Women (Division 1)	Total
2018/2019	174,516 (avg 2,053 per matchday)	185,953 (avg 2,296 per matchday)	360,469
2019/2020	216,564 (avg 2,741 per matchday)	184,081 (avg 2,301 per matchday)	400,645
2020/2021	144,091 (avg 901 per matchday)	61,683 (avg 717 per matchday)	205,774
2021/2022	138,256 (avg 859 per matchday)	109,664 (avg 783 per matchday)	247,920
2022/2023	263,221 (avg 1,431 per matchday)	197,863 (avg 1,192 per matchday)	461,084
2023/2024	402,270 (avg 2,180 per matchday)	133,993 (avg 964 per matchday)	TBA

== Registered players ==
Records show from the new born V.League Division 1 from Season 2018/19.

Season	Men (Division 1)	Women (Division 1)
2018/2019	196	220
2019/2020	203	238
2020/2021	199	248
2021/2022	169	251
2022/2023	190	248
2023/2024	182	235

== See also ==
- V.Challenge League
- Emperor's Cup and Empress' Cup All Japan Volleyball Championship
- Kurowashiki All Japan Volleyball Tournament
- Asian Men's Club Volleyball Championship
- Asian Women's Club Volleyball Championship
- FIVB Volleyball Men's Club World Championship
