= Okayama Prefectural Takahashi High School =

Coordinates: 34.801139°N 133.618917°E

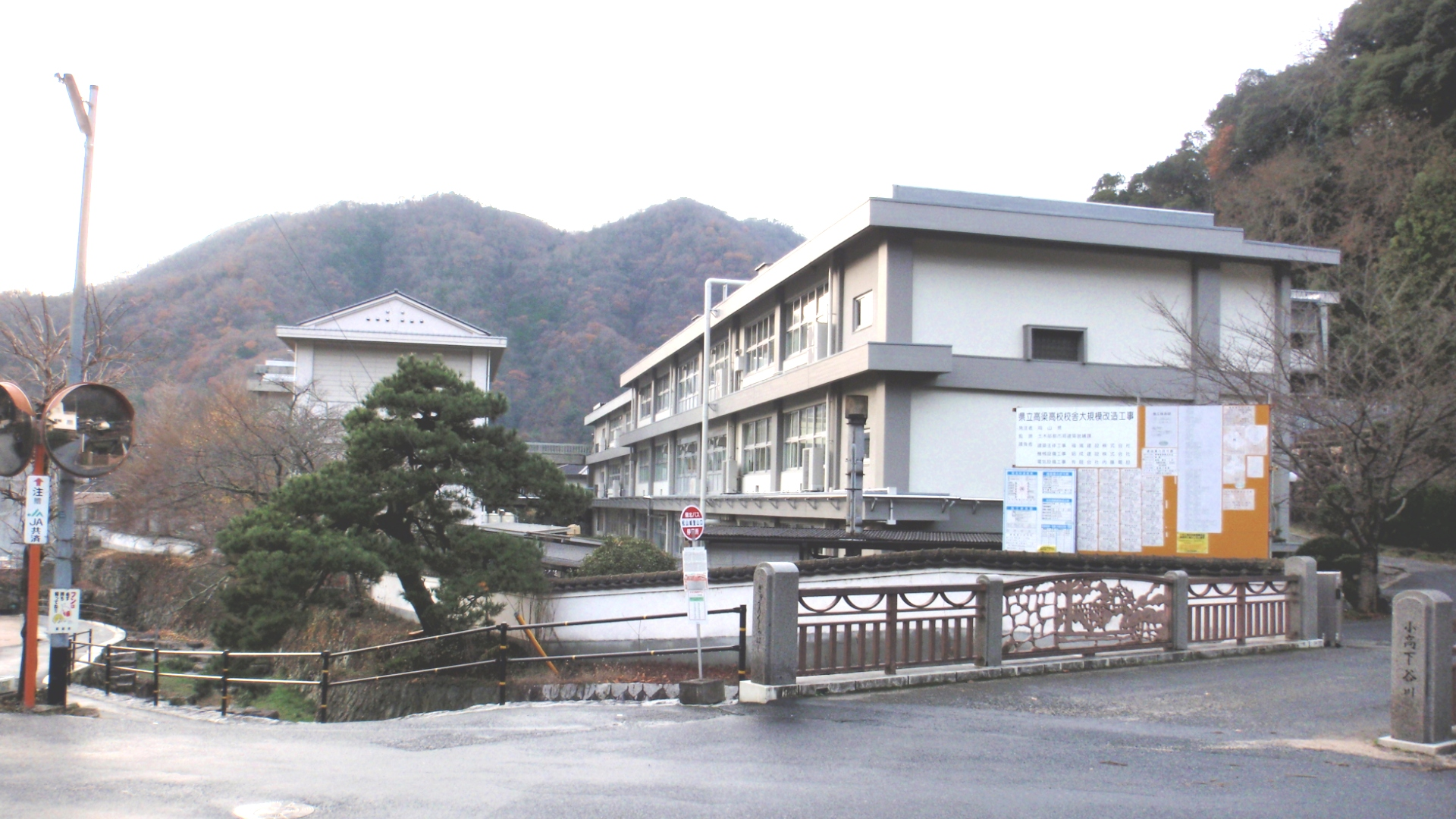
- Takahashi, Okayama prefecture Japan

Information
- Type: Public
- Established: 1881
- Founder: Shigeko Fukunishi
- Website: https://www.takahasi.okayama-c.ed.jp/wp/

Okayama Prefectural Takahashi High School (Japanese: 岡山県立高梁高等学校) is a public full-time high school located in the Uchisange area of Takahashi, Okayama Prefecture. During the Meiji era, there were only four prefectural middle schools (equivalent to modern high schools) in Okayama Prefecture: Okayama (now Asahi High School), Tsuyama, Takahashi, and Yakage. Takahashi High School is the second oldest among them, after Okayama Middle School.

== Characteristic ==
The school offers two academic departments: the General Education Department and the Home Economics Department. Both departments follow a two-semester system per year and adopt a credit-based system that allows students to freely select their courses.

In Takahashi City, this school is considered the most historically significant secondary educational institution. Notably, the Junsei Girls' School, which was later merged into the current Home Economics Department, was the first girls' school established in Okayama Prefecture. As a result, the Home Economics Department of this school can be regarded as the oldest secondary education institution for home economics in the prefecture.

During the era of the former middle school system, the school dormitories were renowned nationwide. There were six dormitories, each named Taisei, Meirin, Nisshin, Onchi, Zōshi, and Kōdō. These dormitories were unique at the time, as they were not only located within the school premises but also scattered throughout the city. Additionally, before World War II, the school was known as a powerhouse in soft tennis, having won national championships.

The school is located on the former site of Onegoya, a residence where the feudal lord stayed during peacetime, serving as an outpost of Bitchū Matsuyama Castle. Consequently, the school stands on the mid-slope of Gagyūzan, where the castle is built, surrounded by hills and stone walls. In the courtyard, there is a tea house called Kōfūkan, along with a garden that features a heart-shaped pond (Shinji-ike), designed by Kobori Masakazu (Enshū), a daimyō and renowned landscape architect of the Edo period.

== High school departments ==
- General Education Department
- Home Economics Department

== Educational Policy ==
- The creation of a cheerful and orderly school environment.
- The development of intelligent and dignified character.
- The cultivation of healthy and practical-minded individuals for society.

== School's Historical Background ==
=== Okayama Prefectural Takahashi High School ===
- August 1949 - Merged the following two schools to form Okayama Prefectural Takahashi High School. Established the General Education Department (Uchisange Main Campus) and the Home Economics Department (Iga Town Branch).
- April 1967 - Integrated the Home Economics Department of Iga Town Branch into the Uchisange Main Campus, and officially closed the Iga Town Branch. The following year, the ownership of the facilities at Iga Town Branch was transferred to the newly established Junsei Junior College (as noted below).
- March 1972 - Construction of the Onchi Dormitory (Boys' Dormitory) and the Astronomical Observation Dome.
- March 1973 - Construction of the Izumi Dormitory (Girls' Dormitory) and the Founders' Memorial Hall.
- March 1980 - Reconstruction of the Kōfūkan (Tea House).
- April 2003 - Introduction of a two-semester system.
- April 2004 - Introduction of a credit-based system.
- April 2006 - Reorganized and merged with Kibi Hokuryō High School (which remained in operation until March 2008, when its students graduated) to form the new Takahashi High School.

=== Junsei High Girls' School ===
- December 1881 (Meiji 14) - Shigeko Fukunishi established a sewing school in Takahashi Town, Mukomachi.
- January 1885 - Added a literary department to the sewing school and reorganized it as Junsei Girls' School.
- July 1895 - Relocated to a newly built facility in Takahashi City, Raikyuji Town.
- April 1908 - Moved the administrative headquarters to Iga Town, Takahashi City, and renamed it to Private Junsei High School for Girls.
- April 1921 - Transferred to a public school under the prefectural government and renamed Okayama Prefectural Junsei High School for Girls.
- April 1943 - Renamed to Okayama Prefectural Takahashi High School for Girls.
- April 1948 - Renamed to Okayama Prefectural Takahashi Second High School. (In 1949, Okayama Prefecture began reorganizing public high schools, and integration with Takahashi First High School and the closure of the Iga Town campus were proposed.)
- In the 1950s - A movement led by graduates of the school and citizens of Takahashi City emerged, demanding either the preservation of the Iga Town campus or the establishment of a junior college or university.
- September 1966 - Takahashi High School transferred the former campus to the newly established school. Citizens of Takahashi City and the university establishment movement worked to ensure the name "Junsei" was preserved, which was accepted.
- April 1967 - Junsei Junior College was opened on the site of the former Iga Town campus. For further details, refer to the section on Junsei Junior College.

=== Takahashi Junior High School (Pre-war system, now an integrated junior and senior high school)" ===
- August 1895 (Meiji 28) - Established Okayama Prefecture Takahashi Ordinary Junior High School in Takahashi Town, Mukomachi.
- April 1899 - Renamed to Okayama Prefecture Takahashi Junior High School.
- October 1900 - Moved to a newly constructed school building at its current location in Takahashi City, Uchiyamashita.
- May 1901 - Renamed to Okayama Prefectural Takahashi Junior High School.
- April 1948 - Renamed to Okayama Prefectural Takahashi First High School.

== Sister School Agreement ==
- Norwood International High School (NIHS), Adelaide, South Australia

== Notable alumni ==
=== Military personnel ===
- Masato Sugi, (1880 – 1951) Japanese Navy (vice admiral) helped elevate Japan's naval power to the top rank in the world.
- Heihachi Yanai, (1888 – 1945) Japanese Army (Lieutenant General), First-Class Senior Engineer, Involved in the Design of Yūshūkan at Yasukuni Shrine.

=== Politicians ===
- Masuo Norii, (1879 – 1936) Former Member of the House of Representatives.
- Kōhei Akagi, (1891 – 1949) Former Member of the House of Representatives, Military and Literary Critic.
- Motoi Ogura, (1931 – 2015) Former mayor of Shibuya, Tokyo; Chairman of the Tokyo Metropolitan Assembly.
- Yūko Ōtsubaki, (1973 – ) Member of the Japan House of Councillors (Social Democratic Party).

=== Bureaucrat ===
- Jun Yokoya, (1884 – 1950) Agricultural Ministry Bureaucrat; Director of Tokyo Racecourse, Executive Director of JRA.
- Ryūichi Fukumoto, (1896 – 1991) Home Ministry Bureaucrat; Governor of Aichi Prefecture, Vice President of ANA.
- Kuniyuki Ueki, (1933 – ) Secretary-General of the Japan Fair Trade Commission (JFTC).
- Motoyuki Ono, (1944 – ) The first Vice-Minister of Ministry of Education, Culture, Sports, Science and Technology of Japan.

=== Business ===
- Ryūji Tanabe, (1884 – 1945) First President of Kansai Electric Power Distribution (now Kansai Electric Power Company)
- Fumiji Tatebayashi, (1904 – 1966) 5th President of Japan Tomato Bank.
- Tōru Hashimoto, (1934 – ) 19th President of Fuji Bank and Chairman of Deutsche Securities.
- Kanji Morisawa, (1934 – ) Former Executive Vice President of Itochu Corporation.
- Akio Koike, (1946 – ) Both the 5th and 7th President, and the 3rd and 5th Chairman of JR Hokkaido.
- Ichiro Tai, (1948 – ) Former Vice President of Toshiba, Outside Director of NSK Ltd.
- Nobuhiko Numata, (1956 – ) Journalist. 13th President of Sun Television and Former President of Daily Sports.
- Tomoaki Nishikawa, (1969 – ) Former CEO of Aiforce Solutions. Associate Professor (AI Research) at Tohoku University.

=== University President and Researcher ===
==== President ====
- Kimio Hayashi, (1883 – 1947) Deputy to the 5th President of Waseda University.
- Renji Koide, (1895 – 1994) 15th President of Meiji University.
- Sukenaga Murai, (1909 – 2006) 10th President of Waseda University.
- Gorou Akagi, (1909 – 1999) 5th President of Okayama University.
- Osamu Akagi, (1944 – ) 9th President of Osaka University of Foreign Studies. Academic Advisor to the Prince Fumihito.

==== Literature ====
- Yusaku Yokoyama, (1882 – 1929) Professor at Waseda University, English Literature Scholar.
- Shigeru Nakajima, (1888 – 1946) Professor at Doshisha University, Legal Scholar, Sociologist, and Christian Thinker.
- Masao Yonekawa, (1891 – 1965) Professor at Waseda University, Russian Literature Scholar.

==== Economics ====
- Kozo Uno, (1897 – 1977) Professor at Tokyo Imperial University. economist and theorists on the field of Marx's theory of value.
- Katsumi Moritani, (1904 – 1964) Professor at Keijō Imperial University.

==== Medicine ====
- Gen'ichi Katō, (1890 – 1979) Japanese doctor was once a candidate for the Nobel Prize in Physiology or Medicine.
- Kenji Tago, (1895 – 1951) Professor at Tokyo Women's Dental Medical College (now Kanagawa Dental University).
- Katashi Inoue, (1897– 1969) Professor Emeritus, Kyoto University; 16th Director of Kyoto University Hospital.
- Tadashi Miyake, (1902 – 1993) Professor Emeritus, Kyoto University; 21st Director of Kyoto University Hospital.
- Hiroyuki Mano, (1959 – ) Japanese doctor. Discovery of the lung cancer-causing gene EML4-ALK.

==== Other ====
- Arao Itano, (1887 – 1972) Honorary Doctor of the Imperial University of Tokyo, Leading Expert in Soil Microbiology Research.
- Yū Yokoya, (1891 – 1969) Marine Biologist, and Discoverer of the Pandalus nipponensis Yokoya (Botan Shrimp).
- Makoto Munemori, (1923 – 1995) Emeritus Professor, Osaka Prefecture University (now Osaka Metropolitan University)
- Akiko Fukai, (1943 – ) Japanese curator of fashion and textile arts.

=== Cultural figures: Media, entertainment, and the arts ===
- Tatsuzō Ishikawa, (1905 – 1985) Japanese writer was once a candidate for the Nobel Prize in Literature.
- Seytsu Takahashi, (1905 – 1984) Koyasan Buddhist Temple's bishop relationship with Johnny Kitagawa.
- Seikaku Takagi, (1923 – 2017) Japanese calligrapher. Recipient of the Prime Minister's Award in Japan.
- Shigeru Onishi, (1928 – 1994) Japanese visual artist. Held in the collection of the Museum of Modern Art, New York.
- Tadao Ogura, (1929 – ) Japanese art critic. Shigeru Onishi's classmate.
- Haruo Mizuno, (1931 – 2008) Film Critic, Film Director, and Japanese actor.
- Katsuhiko Satō, (1940 – ) Painter, Calligrapher, and Ceramic Artist.
- Hiroyuki Shimatani, (1953 – ) 3rd Chairman of Independent Administrative Institution National Museum.
- Shinji Hiramatsu, (1955 – ) Manga artist. His assistant was Yōichi Takahashi known for the author of Captain Tsubasa.

=== Sport ===
- Kyouhei Akagi, (1931 – ) Professional bowler in Japan. Honorary Member of the Japanese Olympic Committee.
- Masakata Mukai, (1935 – ) Approval for the Establishment of the J. League, First Secretary General of the JOC.
- Masao Tachiki, (1941 – 2018) 7th President of the Japan Volleyball Association.

=== Activist ===
- Girō Senoo, (1890–1961) Nichiren Buddhist and Marxist.
- Masao Nishi, (1896 – 1944) Editor of the Communist Party's Journal "Marxism," Influenced Kozo Uno.
- Ryōichi Ikeda, (1906 – 1963) Communist Party Executive, Editor-in-Chief of Akahata, and Key Figure in the Atami Incident.
