= Shigeru Nakajima =

- 中島 重
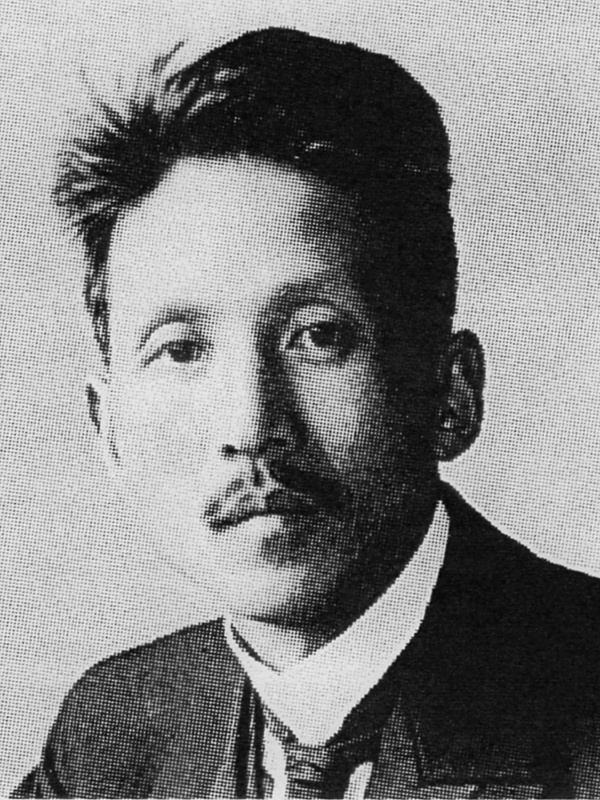
- Born: Shigeru Yanai; May 3, 1888; Takahashi City, Okayama Prefecture, Japan
- Died: May 29, 1946 (aged 58); Kyoto City, Kyoto Prefecture, Japan
- Known for: Pluralism (political theory); Emperor Organ Theory; Social Christianity

Academic background
- Education: Tokyo Imperial University

Academic work
- Notable students: Masao Takenaka
- Notable works: Theory of the Pluralistic State; Introduction to Jurisprudence; The Developing Whole; Principles of the State
- Influenced: Tatsukichi Minobe; Joseph Hardy Neesima; Sakuzō Yoshino

Shigeru Nakajima (Japanese: 中島 重, Hepburn: Nakajima Shigeru; May 3, 1888 – May 29, 1946) was a Japanese legal scholar, sociologist, and Christian thinker. His academic specialties were constitutional law, under the tutelage of Tatsukichi Minobe, and political sociology, with a focus on the theory of the state. He served as a professor at Doshisha University and Kwansei Gakuin University.

Nakajima is known for introducing the concept of a pluralistic state into Japanese political science and sociology, and for promoting the idea of "Social Christianity" alongside Toyohiko Kagawa.

== Biography ==
=== Early life and education ===
Shigeru Nakajima was born on May 3, 1888, in Hirose, Matsuyama Village, Jōbō District, Okayama (present-day Takahashi City, near Bitchu-Hirose Station). He was the third son of Shigenobu Yanai, whose family had a long tradition in the production of otakadan-shi, a high-quality Japanese handmade paper.

As the third son, Nakajima was adopted into the Nakajima family—his uncle's family—who were veterinary professionals. Both the Yanai and Nakajima families had an interest in adopting Western knowledge and advancing modernization, and thus accepted Christianity, which had spread to the Takahashi area. From an early age, Nakajima attended Sunday School at the Takahashi Christian Church, where he studied English and other subjects rooted in Western thought.

He graduated from former Okayama Prefectural Takahashi Junior High School (now Okayama Prefectural Takahashi High School) in 1907 and went on to the Sixth Higher School. In his youth, he was acquainted with the writer Hyakken Uchida and became fascinated with Japanese nationalism, particularly the ideas of Chogyu Takayama, as a form of resistance to the Western ideological orientation of his family. However, after witnessing Takayama's frequent and extreme ideological shifts, Nakajima experienced a change of heart. In 1910, while still a student at the Sixth Higher School, he was baptized at Takahashi Christian Church by Pastor Teigoro Mizoguchi.

He later enrolled in the Faculty of Law at Tokyo Imperial University, where he studied under Tatsukichi Minobe and Sakuzō Yoshino. Through Yoshino, he became involved with Hongo Church and deepened his Christian faith under the guidance of its pastor, Danjo Ebina.

=== Academic career ===
Nakajima graduated from Tokyo Imperial University in 1916. Upon Ebina's recommendation, he became a professor in the Faculty of Law at Doshisha University. In 1922, he published The Theory of the Pluralistic State, which garnered attention in academic circles of law, politics, and sociology in the Kansai region. In 1925, he met Toyohiko Kagawa when Kagawa visited Doshisha for a lecture. Their shared concerns over social inequality led them to engage in poverty alleviation efforts. Confronting the limitations of social activism, they shifted toward a spiritual movement known as the "Kingdom of God Movement." Kagawa approached it from the standpoint of evangelism by religious leaders, while Nakajima viewed it as an educational and enlightenment campaign led by scholars and students to improve society.

Nakajima developed this movement into his own concept of social Christianity and launched the journal Social Christianity at Doshisha. He also served as a leading figure in the Student Christian Movement (SCM) at the university and had a significant influence on student life.

=== Doshisha incident ===
In 1932, Nakajima published Christianity and Politics, criticizing Japan's invasion of Manchuria from a Christian pacifist standpoint. This prompted increasing opposition from right-wing factions and the Ministry of Education. That same year, Doshisha University—then under pressure from government authorities—dismissed Nakajima and five other professors, including Ichiro Yamada and Eijiro Kawai, citing their "radical views." This event came to be known as the "Doshisha Incident."

After leaving Doshisha, Nakajima accepted a professorship at Kwansei Gakuin University. There, he became deeply involved in academic work as well as Christian activism. In 1934, he co-founded the "Kyoto Brotherhood" (Kyoto Shakai Kyoudoutai) with Toyohiko Kagawa, Shigeharu Kimura, and others, further promoting the Kingdom of God Movement. That same year, he also played a central role in establishing the Japanese Federation of Christian Students.

During this period, Nakajima introduced and popularized Western sociological theories in Japan, including those of Otto von Gierke, Léon Duguit, and Harold Laski. He translated numerous important Western texts and became a leading authority on political sociology.

However, as the Pacific War intensified, Nakajima, like many Christian intellectuals, came under scrutiny from the military regime. In 1942, he was forced to resign from Kwansei Gakuin due to his pacifist stance. He returned to his hometown in Okayama Prefecture and endured a period of internal exile. During this time, he continued to write, focusing on biblical studies and Christian ethics.

After Japan's defeat in 1945, Nakajima was appointed as a member of the Okayama Prefectural Education Council and also helped to draft postwar democratic education policies. Despite being offered reinstatement to various academic positions, he declined most, choosing instead to dedicate himself to nurturing Christian democratic ideals at the grassroots level.

Nakajima died on May 29, 1946, at the age of 58. In his final years, he emphasized the need for a society rooted in love, justice, and democracy, inspired by the teachings of Christ. His funeral was held at the Takahashi Christian Church, where he had first been baptized decades earlier.

=== Legacy ===
Nakajima's concept of the pluralistic state significantly influenced postwar Japanese constitutional theory and sociology. He is remembered for synthesizing Christian theology with political thought and for promoting a form of Christianity deeply engaged with social and political issues.

His students included many who would go on to play key roles in postwar Japanese academia and civil society. Today, Nakajima is recognized as a pioneer of Christian social thought in Japan and a forerunner of Japanese civil society movements.

== Selected works ==
=== Sole-authored books ===
- Theory of the Pluralistic State (1922)
- Introduction to Jurisprudence (1925)
- Theory of the Japanese Constitution (1927)
- The Developing Whole (1939)
- Principles of the State (1941)

=== Co-authored works ===
- The New Construction of Christianity (1919, co-authored with Naokatsu Kufuna and others)

=== Journals ===
- Editor-in-chief of the journal Social Christianity (Shakaiteki Kirisutokyo)
