= Shinji Hiramatsu =

Japanese cartoonist and manga artist (born 1960)

Shinji Hiramatsu 平松 伸二
- Born: 22 August 1955 (age 71) Japan・Takahashi, Okayama Prefecture
- Area: Manga artist
- Notable works: Doberman Deka; Black Angels; Murder License Kiba
- Spouse: Uni Yasue

Shinji Hiramatsu (Japanese: 平松 伸二, Hepburn: Hiramatsu Shinji, born August 22, 1955) is a Japanese manga artist. He hails from Takahashi City, Okayama Prefecture, and currently resides in Shibamata, Katsushika Ward, Tokyo. He is best known for works such as Doberman Deka, Black Angels, and Murder License Kiba. His wife is manga scriptwriter Uni Yasue. He serves as a councilor of the Japan Cartoonists Association.

== Biography ==
=== Early career ===
Hiramatsu began drawing manga during his junior high school years. He made his debut while in his first year at Okayama Prefectural Takahashi High School with the short story Shōbu ("The Match"), published in Weekly Shōnen Jump (Issue No. 50, 1971). While still in school, he had five to six one-shots published. He was scouted by editor Hiroki Gotō and moved to Tokyo, where he worked as an assistant to manga artist Norihiro Nakajima. In 1974, he made his serialized debut with Doberman Deka.

=== Style and themes ===
Hiramatsu is known for stories featuring protagonists who crush villains and lawbreakers beyond the reach of justice. Alongside such tales of vengeance and justice, he also produced a number of combat sports manga, including Ricky Typhoon (pro wrestling) and Dosukoi Gigolo (sumo), both featuring numerous risqué scenes. His protagonists are often portrayed as both powerful and androgynously beautiful. Notably, Murder License Kiba features an intersex hero—an audacious creative direction for its time.

In 2015, to mark the 40th anniversary of Doberman Deka and the 30th anniversary of the conclusion of Black Angels, Hiramatsu appeared on the TV program Mandō Kobayashi (aired July 21, 2015, Fuji TV ONE), hosted by comedian Kendō Kobayashi, where he shared behind-the-scenes anecdotes.

Since around spring 2015, Hiramatsu has produced art pieces that blend illustrations of his most iconic characters with traditional Japanese calligraphy, which he terms “manga calligraphy” (man-sho). These pieces are available for purchase at exhibitions and online.

He has also collaborated with Katsushika Ward, where he currently resides, contributing artwork for the cover of the local government’s “My Handy Book”, anti-fraud awareness posters and leaflets, and even wrapping for public buses used in scam prevention campaigns.

A fan of martial arts, Hiramatsu continues to train daily even after turning 60, and is known for his disciplined lifestyle and active involvement in volunteer work.

For a time after his debut, he claimed to be accompanied by an imaginary figure dressed as the Grim Reaper, whom he referred to as “Gedō-man” (literally, “Outlaw Man”). However, this figure was unhelpful and would mostly speak ill of his assistants and girlfriend (later his wife).

== Works ==
=== Serialized works ===
- Doberman Deka (Story by Buronson) – 29 volumes
- New Doberman Deka (Original concept by Buronson) – Sequel to Doberman Deka
- Ricky Typhoon – 9 volumes
- Ricky the Lady – Sequel to Ricky Typhoon
- Black Angels – 20 volumes
- The Matsuda: Black Angels – Spin-off of Black Angels, 3 volumes
- The Matsuda: Superhuman Strongest Legend – Sequel to The Matsuda: Black Angels, 2 volumes
- Oedo Black Angels – A period drama reboot of Black Angels, 6 volumes (as of current publication)[9]
- Love & Fire – 2 volumes
- Kirara – 1 volume; new edition also 1 volume
- Murder License Kiba – 22 volumes
- Murder License Kiba & Black Angels – A crossover series between Murder License Kiba and Black Angels, 13 volumes
- Butōman Gaō – 1 volume
- Aishura: The Legend – 3 volumes (published under the pen name Shinshi Hiramatsu)
- Aibashi -Shite- (Story by Jō Mizuki) – 5 volumes
- Dosukoi Gigolo – 4 volumes
- Aa Dosukoi Gigolo – Sequel to Dosukoi Gigolo, 2 volumes
- M8: A Brave Decision (Story by Tetsuo Takashima) – 1 volume
- Tokyo UWF – 1 volume
- Gedōbō – 6 volumes
- Gedōbō & Murder License Kiba – Crossover of Gedōbō and Murder License Kiba, with Black Angels protagonist Yōji Yukifujii appearing later in the story, 5 volumes
- Monster Hunter (Story by Yukihiro Iizuka)
- Sengoku SANADA Guren-tai
- Goku-Rakugo (Story by Uni Yasue) – First collaborative work with his wife
- Mr. Lady – 1 volume
- Man Junjō Koitarō – 1 volume
- And Then I Became Gedō-man – Autobiographical manga, 4 volumes

=== One-shots ===
- Momotarō '87 – Included in Monster Hunter: Shinji Hiramatsu Short Story Collection

=== Illustrations ===
- Thousand People Sword Kill (2019 album by ALICE IN HELL) – Cover illustration
- Trivia no Izumi (Fuji TV, 2004) – Provided illustrations for trivia segments on Fabre and sumo

== Mentors and assistants ==
=== Mentor ===
- Norihiro Nakajima

=== Assistants ===
- Tetsuya Saruwatari
- Yōichi Takahashi (known for the author of Captain Tsubasa.)
- Kazumata Oguri
- Tomokazu Satō
- Fumiharu Ikeda
- Maima Jōya
- Teppei Imaya
