= Masakata Mukai =

Japanese educator

Masataka Mukai
- 向井 正剛
- Born: February 11, 1935 (age 91); Japan, Takahashi, Okayama Prefecture
- Education: Takahashi High School→ Tokyo University of Education (now the University of Tsukuba)
- Alma mater: University of Tsukuba
- Known for: Winner of spring kōshien baseball tournaments (1965). Key contributor to the successful bid for the 1998 Winter Olympics. Approved the establishment of the J.League. The first Secretary General of the Japanese Olympic Committee.

Masakata Mukai (Japanese: 向井 正剛, Hepburn: Mukai Masakata, born February 11, 1935) is a Japanese educator and former high school baseball manager. He is the only high school baseball manager from Okayama Prefecture to have won a national championship in either the spring or summer Koshien tournaments. While managing Okayama Higashi Commercial High School, he led the team—featuring ace pitcher Masaji Hiramatsu, also from his hometown—to victory in the Spring Koshien. He was born in Takahashi, Okayama Prefecture.

== Biography and career ==
=== Early life and education ===
Mukai was born in 1935 in Takahashi, Okayama Prefecture. After World War II, he attended Okayama Prefectural Takahashi High School. His classmates included Toru Hashimoto, who would become president of Fuji Bank (now part of Mizuho Financial Group) and president of the Development Bank of Japan; Kanji Morisawa, future executive vice president of Itochu Corporation; and Satoshi Minami, who became a university professor. After graduation, Mukai moved to Tokyo and enrolled in the Department of Health Sciences within the Faculty of Physical Education at Tokyo University of Education (now University of Tsukuba). He graduated in 1957 and, in the same year, began working as a teacher at Okayama Higashi Commercial High School.

=== Career as a high school baseball manager ===
From the year after his appointment to Okayama Higashi Commercial High School, Mukai served as the school’s baseball manager from 1958 to 1972. During his tenure, he led the team to ten appearances in the Spring and Summer Koshien tournaments. At the time, the school was not considered a powerhouse in high school baseball, but he quickly transformed it into a competitive team. In particular, he persuaded Masaji Hiramatsu, a talented pitcher from his own hometown of Takahashi, to enroll at the school. With Hiramatsu as ace, Mukai guided the team to a national championship in the 37th Spring National High School Baseball Invitational Tournament in 1965.

This victory marked the first ever Koshien championship for a team from Okayama Prefecture. That same year, the team also won the high school hardball division of the National Sports Festival of Japan. In the summer of 1971, the team reached the semifinals in the 53rd National High School Baseball Championship. As of today, that 1965 spring victory remains the only Koshien championship for a team from Okayama Prefecture. (The highest finish in the summer tournament is runner-up by Okayama University of Science High School in 1999.)

=== Post-managerial career ===
Mukai retired from high school baseball coaching in 1974. Recognized for his achievements, he was appointed as a curriculum supervisor in the Health and Physical Education Division of the Okayama Prefectural Board of Education in the same year. He later became section chief of the same division, and in 1980, he joined the Ministry of Education’s Sports Bureau as a senior specialist. He subsequently rose through the ranks as staff member, senior official, and eventually served as Director of the Sports Division and Director of the Competitive Sports Division. He played a significant role in the establishment of Japan’s first professional soccer league, the J.League, and was responsible for granting its legal recognition. Mukai was also involved in planning the National Training Center, promoting the bid for the Nagano Winter Olympics, and leading efforts to make the Japanese Olympic Committee (JOC) an independent legal entity separate from the Japan Amateur Sports Association.

After retiring from the Ministry of Education, Mukai became the first Secretary General and a board member of the newly incorporated Japanese Olympic Committee in 1991. Following this, he served as a research officer for the Japan-Korea Joint Bid Committee for the 2002 FIFA World Cup and became a professor in the graduate school of Sendai University in 1997. Recognized for his contributions, he was appointed the 9th president of Sendai University in 2002, serving until 2008.
