= Katashi Inoue =

- Born: July 4, 1894; Tamano city, Okayama Prefecture, Japan
- Died: October 4, 1969 (aged 75)
- Known for: Clinical Applications of Vitamin B Complex

Academic background
- Education: Takahashi High School→ Six Higher School→ Kyoto Imperial University
- Alma mater: Kyoto Imperial University

Academic work
- Discipline: Doctor of Medicine

Katashi Inoue (Japanese: 井上 硬, Hepburn: Inoue Katashi, July 4, 1894 – October 4, 1969) was a Japanese medical scientist from Okayama Prefecture. He served as a professor at the Kyoto Imperial University Faculty of Medicine and, following the postwar educational reforms, at the restructured Faculty of Medicine of Kyoto University. Inoue was appointed director of the Institute for Virus Research and served as the 16th director of the Kyoto University Hospital, concurrently acting as a university councilor. He was later named professor emeritus of Kyoto University.

== Biography and career ==
=== Early life and education ===
Katashi Inoue was born in 1894 in Uno Town, Kojima District, Okayama Prefecture (present-day Tamano City). He graduated from former Okayama Prefectural Takahashi Junior High School (now Okayama Prefectural Takahashi High School) in 1912 and entered the Third Department (Medical Section) of the Sixth Higher School. After completing his studies there in 1915, he was admitted to the Faculty of Medicine at Kyoto Imperial University. He joined the Second Department of Internal Medicine and earned his doctoral degree in 1924 with a dissertation titled "Clinical Research on Bile Excretion".

=== Academic career ===
After receiving his doctorate, Inoue continued to serve as a lecturer and assistant professor at Kyoto Imperial University, while working in the Department of Internal Medicine at Kyoto University Hospital. In 1930, he was sent abroad as a research fellow by the Ministry of Education to study pathophysiology. He spent two years conducting research in Germany, France, and the United States, which were global leaders in medical science at the time.

In 1939, Inoue participated in medical support activities for Japanese emigrants in Manchukuo as a member of the Greater East Asia Volunteer Corps (興亜勤労報国隊), which was organized by Japanese universities to provide labor services in Manchukuo and the Republic of China. That same year, he was promoted to full professor at Kyoto Imperial University. He contributed significantly to the clinical research of liver and digestive diseases and conducted systematic studies on the clinical applications of vitamins.

=== Postwar contributions ===
Following World War II, in 1949, Inoue was appointed to the University Council of the newly reorganized Kyoto University in recognition of his achievements. He also became the 16th director of Kyoto University Hospital. On January 25, 1956, he was appointed as a founding member of the planning committee to establish the Institute for Virus Research at Kyoto University. The institute was officially launched on April 1, 1956. Initially headed by Ren Kimura, Inoue succeeded him as director after three months.

In his personal life, Inoue enjoyed horseback riding and traditional Japanese archery (kyūdō).
