= Yusaku Yokoyama =

- Born: December 18, 1882; Takahashi, Okayama Prefecture, Japan
- Died: April 2, 1929 (aged 46)
- Known for: Shakespeare studies in Japan

Academic background
- Education: Takahashi High School→ Waseda University→ Harvard University
- Alma mater: Harvard University

Yusaku Yokoyama (Japanese: 横山 有策, Hepburn: Yokoyama Yūsaku; December 18, 1882 – April 2, 1929) was a Japanese scholar of English literature. Professor at Waseda University.

== Biography ==
=== Early life and education ===
Yokoyama was born on December 18, 1882, in Tamagawa Village, Kawakami District, Okayama Prefecture (present-day Takahashi City). In 1895, he entered the newly established former Okayama Prefectural Takahashi Junior High School (now Okayama Prefectural Takahashi High School) as a first-year student. After graduating in 1900, he enrolled in the preparatory course at Waseda University and was admitted to the university itself in September 1902.

In September 1904, Yokoyama delivered a eulogy as the representative of Waseda University students at the funeral of Lafcadio Hearn (known in Japan as Koizumi Yakumo). He graduated from the Department of English Literature in the Faculty of Letters at Waseda University in 1905. In 1907, he traveled to the United States and studied at Harvard University, from which he graduated in May 1910.

=== Academic career ===
After returning to Japan in 1911, Yokoyama became an English teacher at Waseda Junior High School. In 1916, he was appointed lecturer in the Department of English Literature at Waseda University, where he succeeded Tsubouchi Shōyō in delivering lectures on Shakespeare. In September 1918, at the age of 35, he was promoted to full professor at Waseda University.

In 1920, Yokoyama became an executive secretary of Tsubouchi Shōyō's Cultural Projects Research Association. He also gave a public lecture titled "The Woman Question as Reflected in Modern Literature" at the university’s Central Summer Seminar for Extracurricular Education. From 1923, at the age of 40, he also served as a professor at Japan Women's University. In July 1927, he was appointed to the executive committee for the establishment of the Waseda University Theatre Museum.

Yokoyama's major academic contributions include numerous translations of Shakespeare’s works, such as The Story of Hamlet and The Story of Macbeth. Rather than simply retelling the plot, his translations were notable for their analytical style—interpreting the characters’ personalities and adding scholarly commentary, thus demonstrating a researcher’s perspective. His notable works include Shelley’s Theory of Poetry and Defense of Poetry, Introduction to Literature, and A Concise History of English Literature. His translations include Selected Masterpieces of Shakespeare, and his posthumous work, Studies on Shakespeare, was published after his death.

Yokoyama died at his home in Kichijōji on April 2, 1929, at the age of 46.

== Works ==
- Hints on Translating Japanese into English: For the Students of the Preparatory Course. Hōeikan Shoten, 1913.
- English Composition and Grammar. Hōeikan, 1915.
- Three Hundred Common Translation Errors: Correct English Usage and Grammar Explained. Nishōdō Shoten, 1915.
- Introduction to Literature. Kuno Shoten, 1921.
- Shelley's Theory of Poetry and Defense of Poetry. Studies in English Poetry and Prose, Waseda Taibunsha, 1923.
- A Concise History of English Literature. Waseda Taibunsha, 1927.
- Reforming Life through Art. Bunmei Kyōkai Library, 1928.
- The Story of Hamlet and Macbeth. World Literature Story Series, Fujin no Tomosha, 1929.
- Studies on Shakespeare. Tokyo Taibunsha, 1931.

=== Translations ===
- Charles Hoytby, The Elements of Character. Dai-Nippon Bunmei Kyōkai Jimusho, 1915.
- Hiram Moderwell, Studies in Modern Drama. Dai-Nippon Bunmei Kyōkai Jimusho, 1921.
- Charles Kingsley, The Water-Babies: A Fairy Tale for a Land Baby. Co-translated with Masaki Kurumi. Dōjinsha Shoten, 1921.
- Ashley H. Thorndike, Literature and Society. Co-translated with Masamine Ishii. Waseda Taibunsha, 1923.
- John Drinkwater, Abraham Lincoln. Selected Works of World Literature, Shinchosha, 1924.
- Frederick Lows, The Social Philosophy of Carlyle and Ruskin. Bunmei Kyōkai, 1926.
- Selected Masterpieces of Shakespeare. World Literature Series, Shinchosha, 1929.
- William Shakespeare, Julius Caesar. Shinchosha, Shincho Bunko Series, 1933.
- William Shakespeare, Hamlet. Shinchosha, Shincho Bunko Series, 1933.
- William Shakespeare, Romeo and Juliet. Shinchosha, Shincho Bunko Series, 1933.
