= Kenji Tago =

- Born: March 14, 1895; Tsuyama city, Okayama Prefecture, Japan
- Died: July 14, 1951 (aged 56)
- Known for: Development of orthodontic technology

Academic background
- Education: Takahashi High School→ Tokyo Dental College→ University of Pennsylvania
- Alma mater: University of Pennsylvania

Academic work
- Discipline: Doctor of Dental Surgery

Kenji Tago (Japanese: 多胡 謙治, Hepburn: Tago Kenji, March 14, 1895 – July 14, 1951) was a Japanese dentist and educator. He served as a professor at Tokyo Women's College of Dental Science (now Kanagawa Dental University). He was a native of Tsuyama, Okayama Prefecture.

== Biography ==
=== Early life ===
Kenji Tago was born on March 14, 1895, in Katsukamo Village, Katsuta District, Okayama Prefecture (present-day Tsuyama), as the third son of Matajiro Tago. He attended former Okayama Prefectural Takahashi Junior High School (now Okayama Prefectural Takahashi High School), and after graduating in 1916, he entered Tokyo College of Dental Science (now Tokyo Dental College). He graduated in 1919 and was immediately appointed as an assistant at the college at the age of 24.

=== Career as a dentist ===
Tago worked as an assistant at Tokyo College of Dental Science until December 1921, when he resigned and traveled to the United States. He enrolled at the University of Pennsylvania, where he earned a Doctor of Dental Surgery (D.D.S.) degree in June 1923. After returning to Japan in 1925, he opened a dental clinic in Akasaka, Tokyo, while also teaching as a professor at Tokyo Women's College of Dental Science (now Kanagawa Dental University).

In 1927, at the age of 32, his first daughter, Masako, was born. In 1935, he served as the president of the Japanese Orthodontic Society. Tago was a well-known figure in the Japanese dental community, particularly recognized for his expertise and contributions to the advancement of orthodontic techniques. He died at his home on July 14, 1951, at the age of 56.

=== Personal life and interests ===
Tago enjoyed golf and once made a hole-in-one. He also had an interest in tennis and traditional Japanese music.
