= Bitchū, Okayama =

Dissolved municipality in Okayama prefecture, Japan

Bitchū (備中町, Bitchū-chō) was a town located in Kawakami District, Okayama Prefecture, Japan.

As of 2003, the town had an estimated population of 2,893 and a density of 28.21 persons per km^{2}. The total area was 102.56 km^{2}.

On October 1, 2004, Bitchū, along with the town of Ukan (from Jōbō District), and the towns of Kawakami and Nariwa (all from Kawakami District), was merged into the expanded city of Takahashi and no longer exists as an independent municipality.
