= Ryōichi Ikeda =

Japanese politician (1906–1963)

- 池田 亮一

Senior member of the Japanese Communist Party
- In office 1931–1932

Personal details
- Born: 1906 Okayama prefecture, Japan
- Died: June 14, 1963 (aged 57)
- Party: Japanese Communist Party
- Education: Takahashi High School→ Six higher school→ Kyoto University

Ryōichi Ikeda (Japanese: 池田 亮一, Hepburn: Ikeda Ryōichi; real name: 三村 亮一, Hepburn: Mimura Ryōichi; 1906 – June 14, 1963) was a Japanese communist, editor-in-chief of the Shimbun Akahata, and a senior member of the Japanese Communist Party. He was born in Okayama Prefecture.

== Early life and education ==
Ikeda was born in Okayama Prefecture in 1906. He attended the former Okayama Prefectural Takahashi Junior High School (now Okayama Prefectural Takahashi High School), and in 1923, he entered the Literature Section "Otsu" of the Sixth Higher School. After graduating in 1927, he enrolled in the Faculty of Economics at Kyoto Imperial University, from which he graduated in 1930. During his time at Kyoto University, he became deeply involved with communist ideology and joined the Japanese Communist Party after graduation.

== Communist Activities ==
From a young age, Ikeda sympathized with communism and became involved in related activities early on. He played a leadership role in Japan's labor and leftist movements, including serving as the editor-in-chief of Akahata, the official newspaper of the Japanese Communist Party. In 1932, he was arrested in connection with the "Atami Incident" and subjected to severe interrogation, leading to his imprisonment. His beliefs and actions were regarded as a threat by the Japanese government and he was kept under strict surveillance.

Ikeda was active as a communist before World War II and made significant contributions to the development of the People's Republic of China. After Japan's surrender, he relocated to Northeast China (formerly Manchukuo), where he engaged in film production under the auspices of the Chinese Communist Party, making notable contributions to the Chinese film industry and strengthening propaganda efforts.

== Involvement in Manchuria and Chinese Communist Activities ==
After World War II, Ikeda became involved in the film industry in Northeast China, initially through the Japanese-led Manchuria Film Association (Man'ei). However, as Man'ei was taken over by the Chinese Communist Party, Ikeda continued his work in the film sector under the new regime. He played a central role in establishing China’s first post-revolution film studio, the Northeast Film Studio (Dongbei Dianying Zhipianchang), which laid the foundation for the modern Chinese film industry. Ikeda, alongside Chinese filmmakers, helped develop socialist cinema. Beyond filmmaking, he was also involved in education and socialist development, contributing to the CCP’s revolutionary efforts.

=== Tsuruoka Period ===
After the liberation of Manchurian regions, Ikeda moved to Tsuruoka City in Yamagata Prefecture. There, he took on a leadership role in guiding former Japanese employees of the South Manchuria Railway and supported the educational activities of a group of around 100 people. Among them was Tomu Uchida, who would later become a renowned film director. Ikeda spent this period studying and practicing socialist theory with the group. He also contributed to the Japanese edition of People’s China magazine. In 1963, he attended the 10th anniversary celebration of the magazine’s founding. At the event, he had the honor of speaking directly with senior Chinese officials such as Premier Zhou Enlai and Vice Premier Chen Yi. He later recalled sitting next to Zhou Enlai as one of the most memorable moments of his life.

== Death and legacy in China ==
On the morning of June 14, 1963, at around 10:00 a.m., Ikeda collapsed in the toilet of his residence after practicing tai chi in the garden, having left an unfinished manuscript on his desk. When he did not return to work at the expected time, a party member found him unconscious. Despite being taken to the hospital, he died shortly thereafter. He was 57 years old. Following his death, Vice Premier Chen Yi expressed his condolences and praised Ikeda’s contributions to socialist construction and the promotion of Japan–China friendship. Ikeda’s achievements extended beyond filmmaking to the building of socialism and the fostering of goodwill between the peoples of Japan and China. His efforts as a Japanese national contributing to China’s socialist development were highly esteemed by the Chinese Communist Party.
