= Shunichi Kawai =

Japanese volleyball player (born 1963)

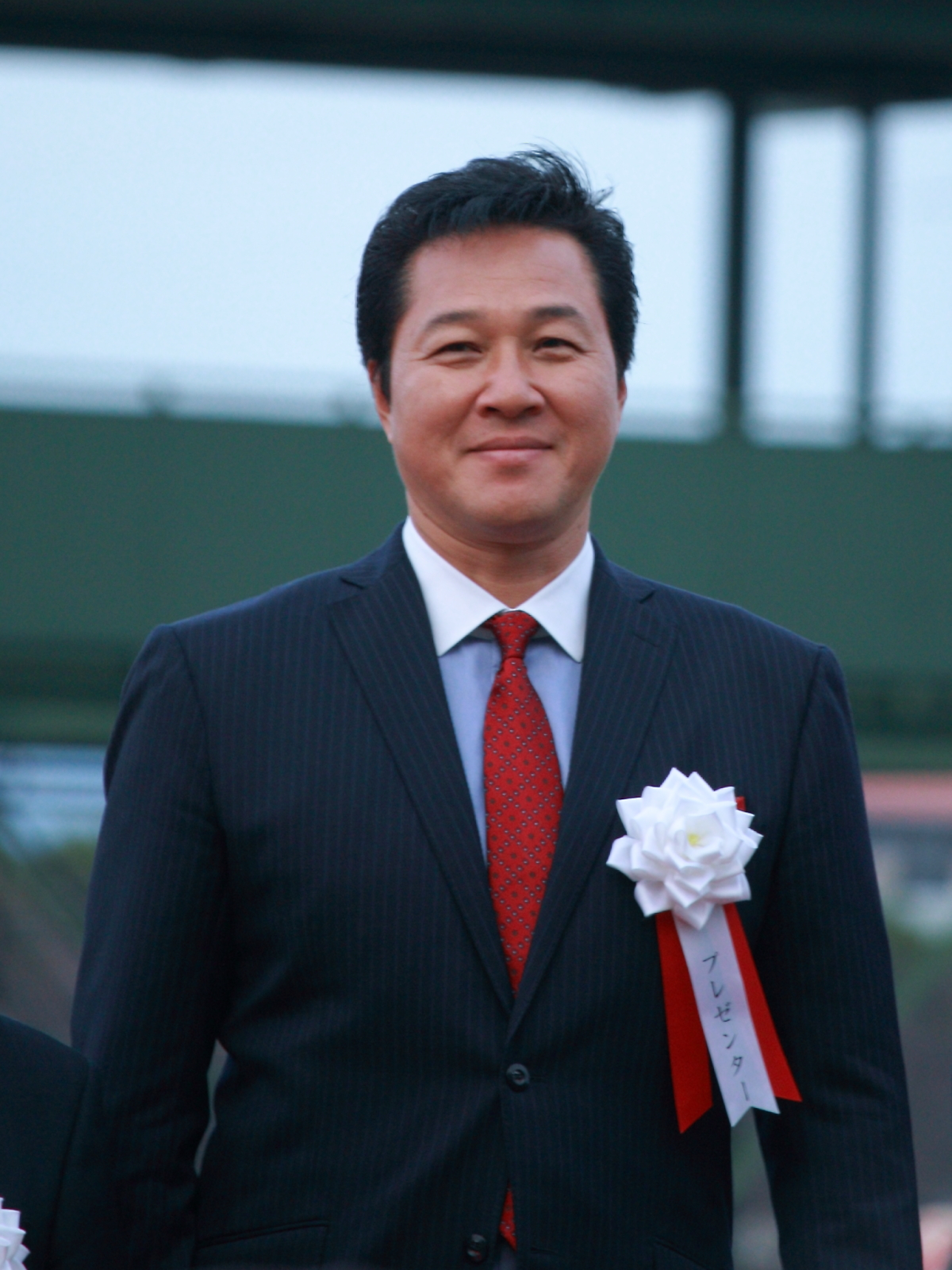
- Shunichi Kawai, 2015

Personal information
- Born: 3 February 1963 (age 63); Itoigawa, Niigata, Japan
- Height: 1.94 m (6 ft 4 in)

Volleyball information
- Position: Middle blocker
- Number: 12

National team
| 1984–1988 | Japan |
Honours
Men's volleyball
Representing Japan
Goodwill Games
| Bronze medal – third place | 1986 Moscow |

Shunichi Kawai (川合 俊一, Kawai Shun'ichi; born 3 February 1963) is a Japanese former volleyball player who competed at the 1984 Summer Olympics in Los Angeles and the 1988 Summer Olympics in Seoul. Kawai competed at the 1986 Goodwill Games in Moscow and won a bronze medal.

Since retiring, Kawai has been working as a sports announcer and television tarento.

In 2022, Shunichi Kawai was elected to be the president of Japan Volleyball Association.
