= Akiko Fukai =

- 深井晃子
- Born: Akiko Takahashi (高橋晃子); September 10, 1943 (age 81); Japan, Takahashi, Okayama Prefecture
- Education: Takahashi High School→ Ochanomizu University
- Awards: Cultural Affairs Agency Director-General's Award in Japan

Akiko Fukai (Japanese: 深井 晃子, Fukai Akiko, born September 10, 1943) is a Japanese curator of fashion and textile arts. She is a director and honorary curator of the Kyoto Costume Institute. Fukai is also an honorary doctor of Ochanomizu University. She has served as a professor at Kobe Women's University and Shizuoka University of Art and Culture. Her birth name is Akiko Takahashi (Japanese: 高橋 晃子). She is originally from Takahashi City, Okayama Prefecture.

== Biography ==
She received a bachelor's and a master's degree in fashion history from Ochanomizu University and studied at Paris-Sorbonne University.

Currently, Fukai is the Director and Chief Curator of the Kyoto Costume Institute. Her catalogue of the collection of the Kyoto Costume Institute has been published in Japanese, English, French, and German by popular German arts books publisher Taschen. Fukai has stated in interviews that the future of Japanese fashion is "basic clothing at reasonable prices."

Her scholarship emphasizes the relationship between tradition and innovation in Japanese fashion throughout history, with a particular focus on designs produced in Japan since the 1980s, the subject of her 2010 traveling exhibition Future Beauty: 30 Years of Japanese Fashion. The exhibition was the first comprehensive survey of Japanese avant-garde fashion designers from this period and focused on the works of Issey Miyake, Rei Kawakubo, Yohji Yamamoto, and Junya Watanabe among others. The exhibition began at the Barbican Art Gallery and traveled widely, including to the Seattle Art Museum.

One of the main differences she posits between Western and Japanese clothing is, in her own words: "In Europe, clothing is definitely external to the body. In Japan it is a coming together of the body and the garment ... [that] derives partly from the process of dressing and the rituals – the layering and layering of the kimono, for example." Her work on Japonism in fashion, inside and outside of Japan, examines western ideas of Japanese dress and how these ideas and styles were re-imported for a Japanese audience.

She has received numerous awards for her work, including honors from the Japanese Commissioner for Cultural Affairs in 2008 and the Academy of Japonism in Japan in 2000; in 2004, she received an honorary doctoral degree from her alma mater, the National University of Ochanomizu.

== Exhibitions (selected) ==
- “Revolution in Fashion 1715–1815” (National Museum of Modern Art, Kyoto, 1988)
- “Japonisme et Mode” (Musée de la Mode et du Costume, Paris, 1996)
- “Japonism in Fashion” (Brooklyn Museum and Los Angeles County Museum of Art, 1998)
- “Fashion in Colors” (Cooper-Hewitt, National Design Museum, 2005–2006)
- “Luxury in Fashion Reconsidered” (Museum of Contemporary Art, Tokyo, and National Museum of Modern Art, Kyoto, 2009–2010)
- “Future Beauty: 30 Years of Japanese Fashion.” (2010–2011, Barbican Art Gallery, London, other locations)

== Publications ==
- Japonism in Fashion (1994)
- Fashion: The Collection of the Kyoto Costume Institute, A History from the 18th to the 20th Century (Taschen, 2002)
- The Century of Fashion (2005)
- The Cutting Edge: Fashion from Japan (2005)
- Fashion in Colors (2006)
- Reading Fashion from Pictures (2009)
- Future Beauty: 30 Years of Japanese Fashion (2010)
- Fashion: a Fashion History of the 20th Century (2012)
- Kimono Refashioned: Japan's Impact on International Fashion (2018)
