= Gen'ichi Katō =

- Born: February 11, 1890; Japan, Niimi city, Okayama Prefecture
- Died: May 1, 1979 (aged 89)
- Known for: Non-attenuated Conduction Theory of Nerve Anesthesia
- Awards: Japan Academy Prize (academics); Japan Medical Association’s Highest Honor Award; Order of the Sacred Treasure, Second Class

Academic background
- Education: Takahashi High School→ First Higher School→ Kyoto Imperial University
- Alma mater: Kyoto Imperial University

Academic work
- Discipline: Doctor of Medicine

Gen'ichi Katō (Japanese: 加藤 元一, Katō Gen'ichi, February 11, 1890 (Meiji 23) – May 1, 1979 (Shōwa 54) ) was a Japanese physiologist. He was a professor emeritus at the Keio University School of Medicine. He was also an honorary member of the Argentine Biological Society and Medical Association, as well as an honorary member of the American Physiological Society. He was nominated three times for the Nobel Prize in Physiology or Medicine.

== Early life and education ==
Gen'ichi Katō was born in 1890 in Niimi Town, Aga District, Okayama Prefecture (now Niimi City). He attended the former Okayama Prefectural Takahashi Junior High School (now Okayama Prefectural Takahashi High School), which was located near his hometown. After graduating in 1909 (Meiji 42), he proceeded to the First Higher School under the old system before enrolling in the Kyoto Imperial University Medical School.

In 1916 (Taisho 5), he graduated from Kyoto Imperial University Medical School and joined the university's Department of Physiology. Two years later, in 1918, he was appointed as a lecturer.

== Career ==
=== Professor at Keio University School of Medicine ===
In December 1918, at the young age of 28, Katō transferred to the newly established Keio University School of Medicine as a professor of physiology. His primary research focus was on nerve excitation conduction during anesthesia. At the time, the prevailing theory on nerve excitation conduction in anesthetized regions was the "attenuation theory" proposed by Professor Hermann of the University of Bonn, Germany, which Katō himself initially supported.

However, through his subsequent research, Katō proposed a new theory known as the "Non-attenuated Conduction Theory". In 1923, he presented this theory at the 2nd Annual Meeting of the Physiological Society of Japan. The theory posited that nerve excitation conduction in anesthetized regions remains qualitatively unchanged and only undergoes quantitative alterations. His presentation initially sparked controversy, even drawing the ire of his mentor, Professor Ishikawa, but Katō continued his research.

In 1926, at the 12th International Congress of Physiological Sciences held in Stockholm, he demonstrated his experiments publicly. He had planned to use toads for his experiments and arranged for their transportation via Siberia, but all the toads perished during transit. As a result, he substituted them with Dutch water frogs and successfully conducted his experiment. His presentation received high acclaim, leading to widespread support from physiologists in Europe and the United States.

Due to the international recognition of his theory, Katō was awarded the Imperial Academy Prize in 1927. However, the decision to grant him the award, made on March 12, 1927, sparked controversy. On March 15, his former colleagues, including Hidetsurumaru Ishikawa of Kyoto Imperial University, protested against the award, leading to a heated debate. Despite the opposition, Kato's theory gradually gained acceptance, and by the 1930s, the "Non-attenuated Conduction Theory" had become widely established.

At the 15th International Congress of Physiological Sciences held in Moscow in 1935, Katō was invited as an honorary guest by the congress president, Ivan Pavlov. There, he presented his findings on "The Ecological Emergence of Single Nerve Fibers" and "Experimental Validation of the All-or-None Law", both of which were met with great success. Later, he became the first in the world to successfully conduct experiments on "single nerve fibers", making significant contributions to the development of modern neurophysiology.

=== Professor Emeritus at the School of Medicine ===
Katō continued his career as both an educator and researcher. From 1944 to 1952, he served as the Director of the Keio Medical School. In recognition of his achievements, he was awarded the Keio Gijuku Prize. In 1959, he was appointed as a board member of the International Union of Physiological Sciences (IUPS), and in 1960, he was elected as an honorary member of the International Brain Research Organization (IBRO). In 1965, he chaired the 23rd International Congress of Physiological Sciences, hosted by the Science Council of Japan, welcoming over 1,600 participants from around the world.

Later in life, Katō was also honored internationally. He became an honorary member of the Argentine Biological Society and Medical Association and, in 1965, was selected as an honorary member of the American Physiological Society. In 1976, he was elected as a member of the Japan Academy. On May 1, 1979 (Showa 54), Katō died in Tokyo due to acute pneumonia at the age of 89. His posthumous Buddhist name was Daigen'in Zenkaku Fugen Kyoshi, and his remains were interred at Kumoi Temple in Niimi City, his hometown In 1958, he had been named an honorary citizen of Niimi City, Okayama Prefecture.

=== Legacy and contributions ===
Katō devoted himself to passing down his research findings to future generations and left behind numerous publications. One of his most notable works was his autobiography, The Path of a Scientist. In addition to his scientific contributions, Katō showed deep respect for the animals used in his experiments. In 1937, he established the Hikazuka" (Toad Memorial) at Sasa Temple in Shinjuku, Tokyo, as a tribute to the animals sacrificed for research.

Kato's work significantly elevated Japan's position in the field of physiology, and his achievements continue to be recognized today. Furthermore, outside of academia, he played an active role in student life, serving as the cheering squad leader for Keio University for 30 years. He was particularly passionate about supporting the Waseda-Keio rivalry (Sokeisen).

=== Head of Keio University Cheerleading Division ===
While contributing significantly to the development of physiology as a professor at Keio University, Gen'ichi Katō also played an active role in the university's cheerleading activities. His involvement in the cheerleading division went beyond academic and educational spheres, deeply influencing student life and shaping the university's culture.

Katō became involved in the cheerleading activities shortly after assuming his position as a professor at Keio University's School of Medicine in 1918. At the time, Keio University was establishing a rivalry with Waseda University, and boosting university morale through sports events like the Waseda-Keio Game (Sokeisen) became a significant focus. Katō resonated with the importance of such student activities and took on a leadership role in guiding the cheerleading division.

One of his notable contributions was his involvement in the creation and instruction of cheer songs, which played a key role in developing Keio's unique cheerleading culture. As a leader, Katō fostered student unity and supported the cheerleading division's operations, ensuring that the cheerleading activities were respected and continued to thrive within the university. His efforts went beyond simply energizing sports events; they helped instill the spirit of Keio University and contributed to the development of future generations of students.

== Awards and honors ==
- Japan Academy Prize (academics) in 1927.
- Awarded the Order of the Sacred Treasure, Second Class in 1972.

== Research and achievements ==
Katō specialized in physiology, focusing on the mechanisms of nerve excitation conduction. He is best known for his research on the "Non-attenuated Conduction Theory in Nerve Anesthesia" and the "Dissection of Single Nerve Fibers".

Despite being nominated for the Nobel Prize in Physiology or Medicine three times (1928, 1935, 1937), Katō did not win the award. The reason that he did not receive the Nobel Prize, despite being nominated three times before World War II, may be partly attributed to the racial discrimination that was prevalent at the time.

In recognition of his pioneering experiments, a Toad Memorial (Hikazuka) was established at Sasa Temple, near the Keio University School of Medicine, to honor the thousands of frogs used in his experiments.
