= Takahashi, Okayama =

Takahashi 高梁市
- City
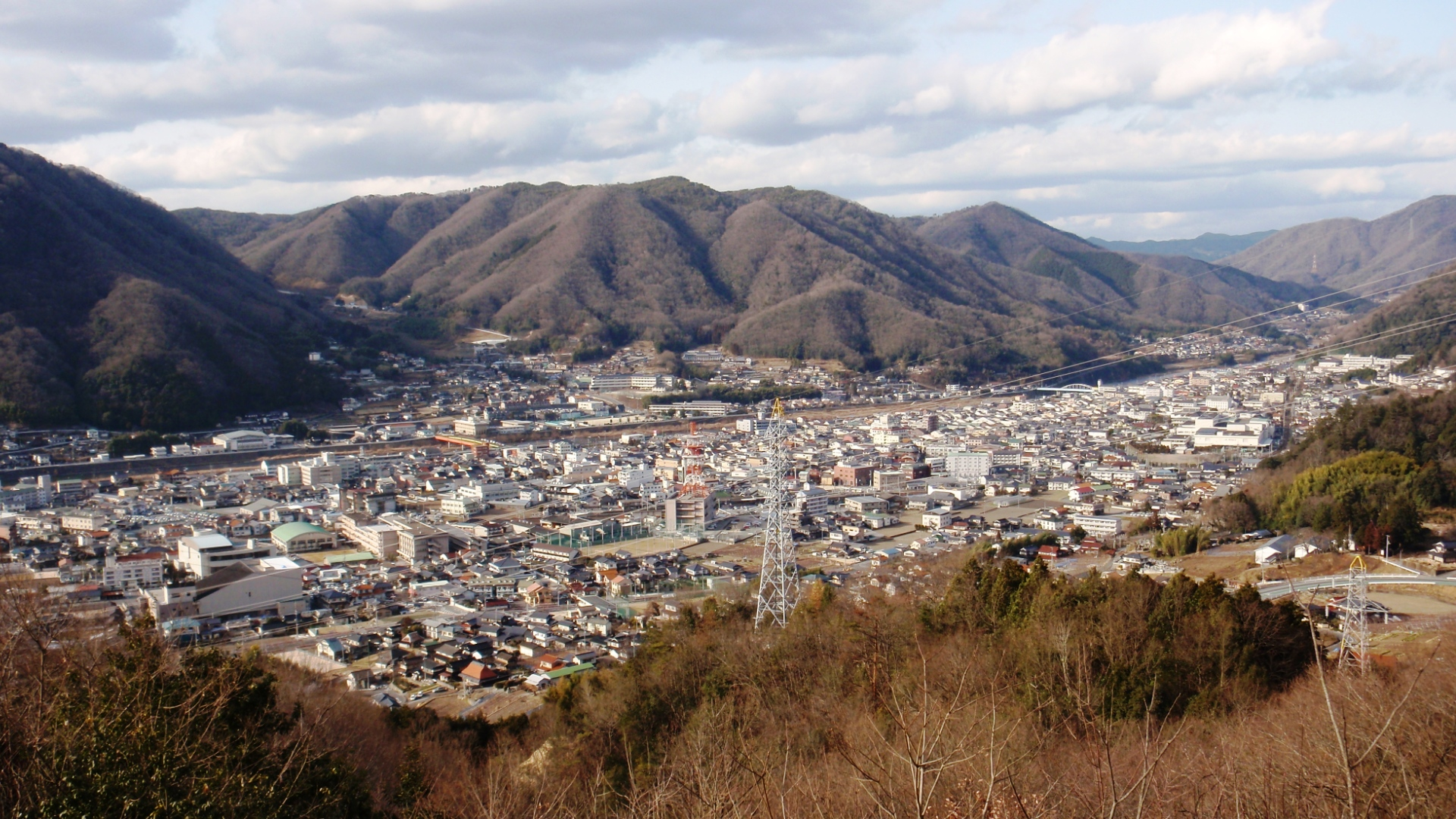
- View of Downtown Takahashi, Okayama, from Atago Bridge

- Flag Seal
- Location of Takahashi in Okayama Prefecture

- Location in Japan
- Coordinates: 34°47′29″N 133°36′59″E
- Country: Japan
- Region: Chūgoku (San'yō)
- Prefecture: Okayama

Government
  - Mayor: Yoshio Ishida (since October 2024)

Area
  - Total: 546.99 km^{2} (211.19 sq mi)

Population (February 28, 2023)
  - Total: 27,538
  - Density: 50.345/km^{2} (130.39/sq mi)
- Time zone: UTC+09:00 (JST)
- City hall address: 2043 Matsubara-dori, Takahashi-shi, Okayama-ken 716-8501
- Climate: Cfa
- Website: www.city.takahashi.okayama.jp
- Symbols
- Bird: Megaceryle lugubris
- Flower: Cherry blossom
- Tree: Pinus densiflora

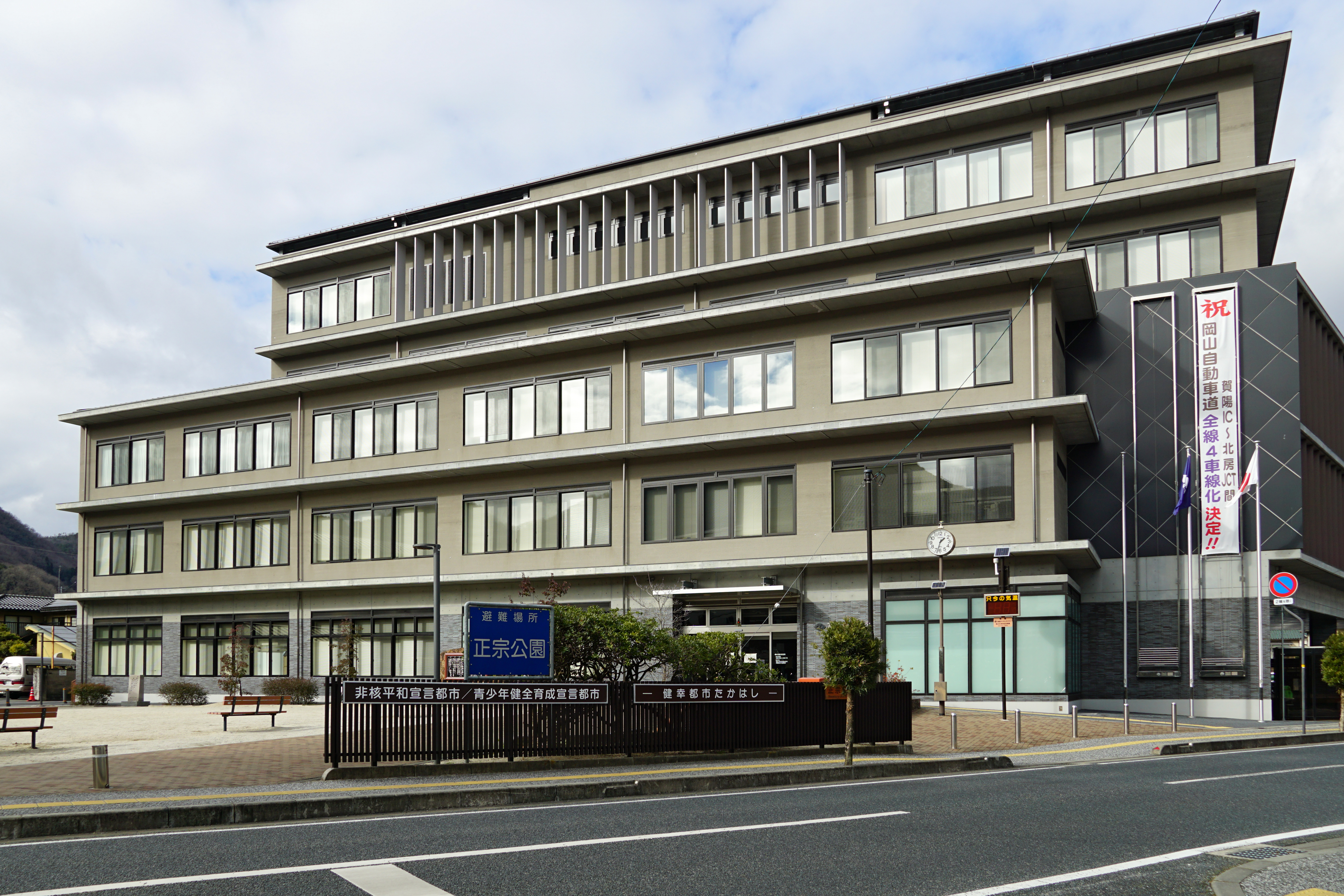
Takahashi City Hall

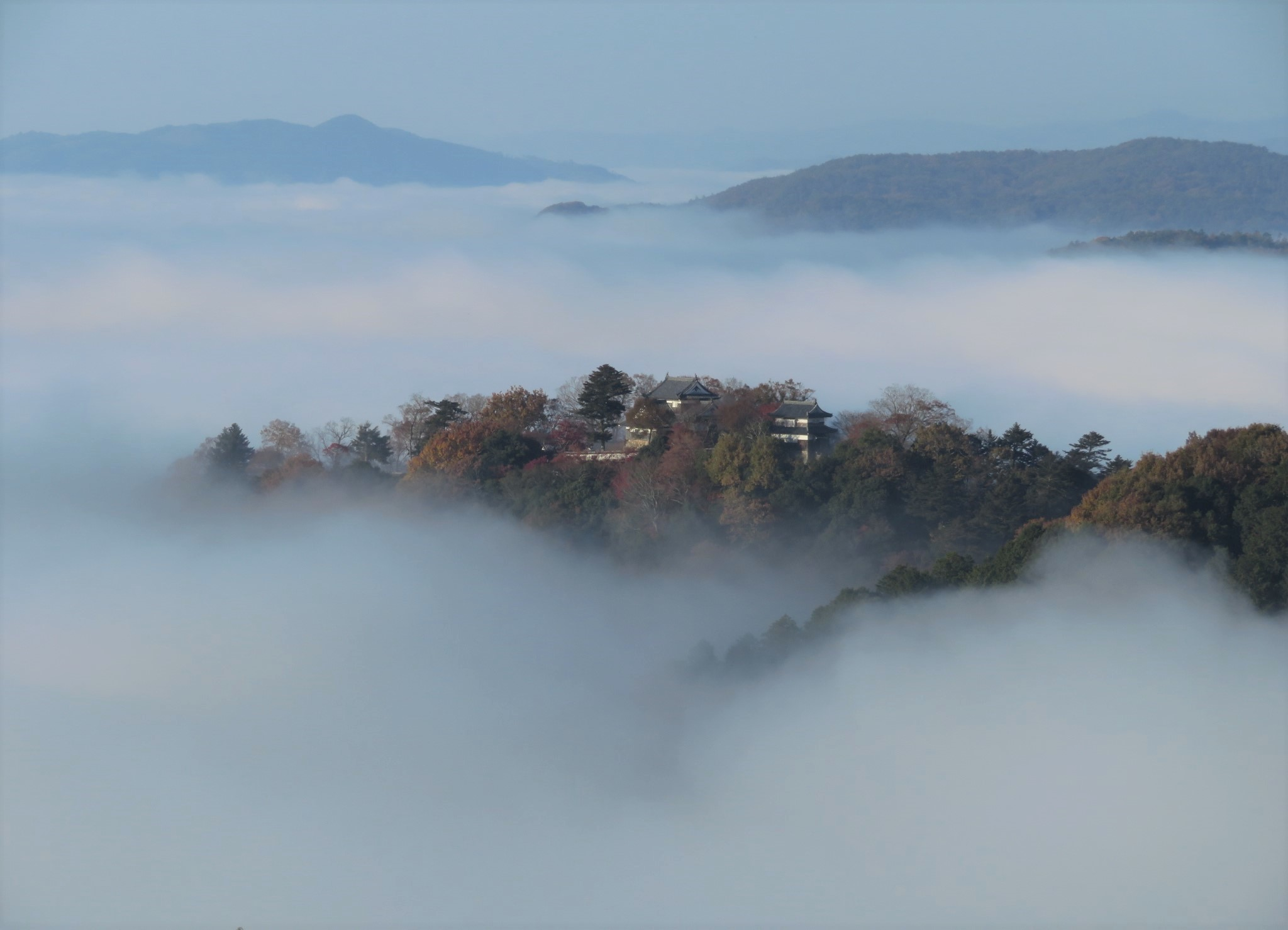
Bitchu Matsuyama Castle floating on a sea of clouds

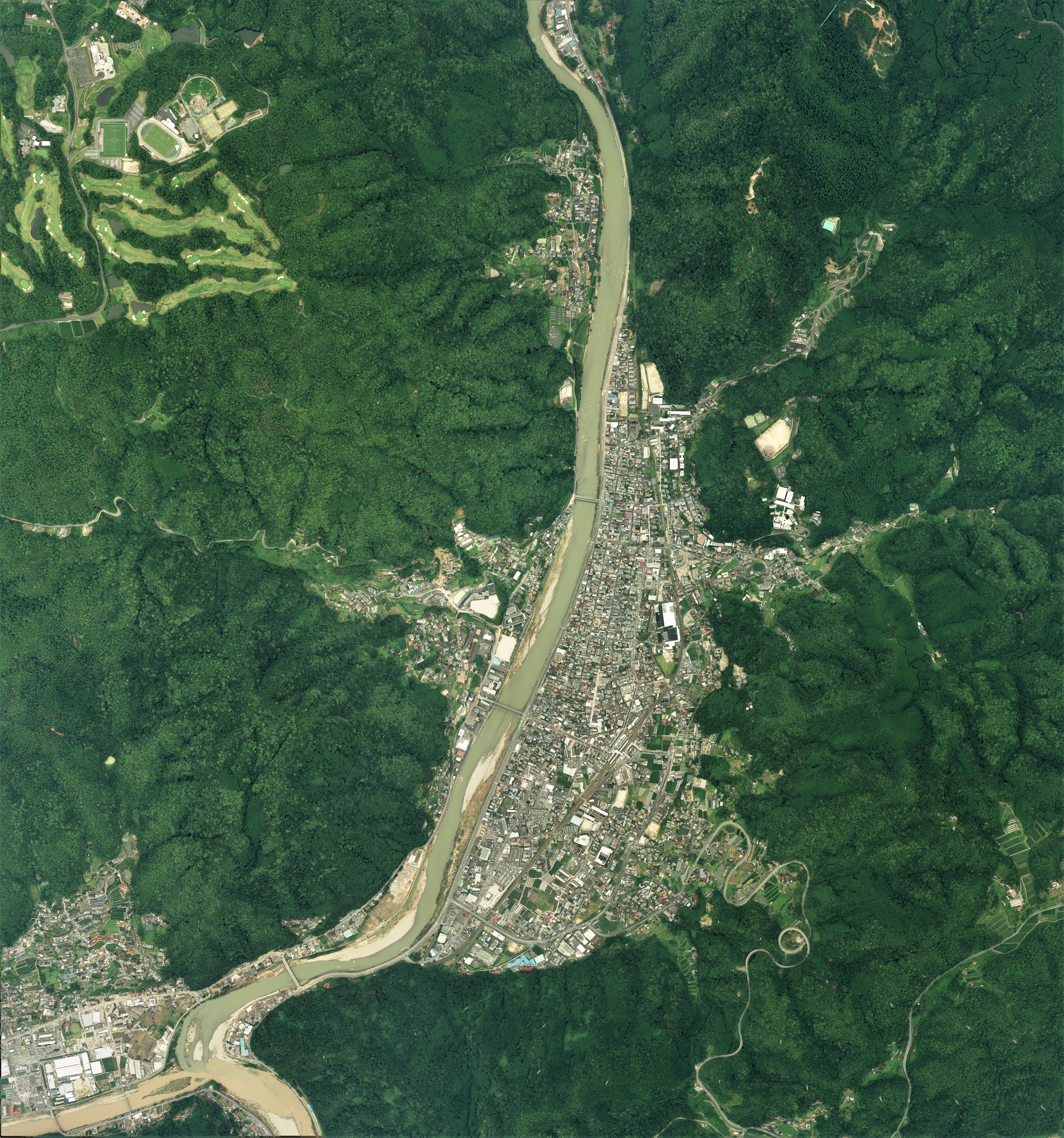
Aerial view of Takahashi city center

Takahashi (高梁市, Takahashi-shi) is a city located in Okayama Prefecture, Japan. As of 28 February 2023, the city had an estimated population of 27,538 in 13,678 households. and a population density of 50 persons per km^{2}. The total area of the city is 546.99 square kilometres (211.19 sq mi). Bitchū Matsuyama Castle overlooks the town. Another significant location is Raikyū-ji, a Buddhist temple with a historic garden.

== Geography ==
Takahashi is located in the midwestern part of Okayama Prefecture, about 32 kilometers northwest of the center of the prefectural capital at Okayama city. The Takahashi River, one of the three major rivers in the prefecture, flows north–south through the eastern side of the city, and the Kibi Plateau spreads east–west on both sides of the river. The municipality measures 35 kilometers from east-to-west and 30 kilometers from north-to-south and the fourth largest municipality in Okayama Prefecture in terms of area. Elevation ranges from 50 to 100 meters in the basin and 300 to 500 meters in the hills. In general, the elevation is higher in the west and lower in the east. The central city area is located in the basin that spreads to the north of the point where the Nariwa River joins the Takahashi River, and retains the old townscape of a castle town. The center of the Nariwa district was also a castle town in the basin along the Nariwa River. In the basin of the Nariwa River, which flows through the western part of the city, the geology is limestone karst topography. In terms of land usage, 78.5% of the total area of the city is classified as forest and wilderness, and 8.7% as cultivated land.

=== Neighboring municipalities ===
Hiroshima Prefecture

- Jinsekikōgen
- Shōbara

Okayama Prefecture

- Ibara
- Kibichūō
- Maniwa
- Niimi
- Sōja

=== Climate ===
Takahashi has a humid subtropical climate (Köppen climate classification Cfa). The average annual temperature in Takahashi is 14.5 °C (58.1 °F). The average annual rainfall is 1,230.3 mm (48.44 in) with July as the wettest month. The temperatures are highest on average in August, at around 27.0 °C (80.6 °F), and lowest in January, at around 2.8 °C (37.0 °F). The highest temperature ever recorded in Takahashi was 40.4 °C (104.7 °F) on 31 July 2025; the coldest temperature ever recorded was −10.0 °C (14.0 °F) on 27 February 1981.

Climate data for Takahashi (1991−2020 normals, extremes 1979−present)
Month	Jan	Feb	Mar	Apr	May	Jun	Jul	Aug	Sep	Oct	Nov	Dec	Year
Record high °C (°F)	18.4 (65.1)	22.4 (72.3)	27.8 (82.0)	31.6 (88.9)	34.2 (93.6)	36.7 (98.1)	40.4 (104.7)	39.8 (103.6)	37.0 (98.6)	32.0 (89.6)	28.2 (82.8)	20.1 (68.2)	40.4 (104.7)
Mean daily maximum °C (°F)	8.5 (47.3)	9.7 (49.5)	13.8 (56.8)	20.1 (68.2)	25.1 (77.2)	27.8 (82.0)	31.6 (88.9)	33.1 (91.6)	28.6 (83.5)	22.7 (72.9)	16.5 (61.7)	10.7 (51.3)	20.7 (69.2)
Daily mean °C (°F)	2.8 (37.0)	3.7 (38.7)	7.3 (45.1)	12.9 (55.2)	18.1 (64.6)	22.0 (71.6)	26.0 (78.8)	27.0 (80.6)	22.7 (72.9)	16.3 (61.3)	10.1 (50.2)	4.9 (40.8)	14.5 (58.1)
Mean daily minimum °C (°F)	−1.2 (29.8)	−0.9 (30.4)	1.8 (35.2)	6.6 (43.9)	12.1 (53.8)	17.4 (63.3)	22.0 (71.6)	22.8 (73.0)	18.5 (65.3)	12.0 (53.6)	5.9 (42.6)	1.0 (33.8)	9.8 (49.7)
Record low °C (°F)	−8.3 (17.1)	−10.0 (14.0)	−5.5 (22.1)	−2.2 (28.0)	1.0 (33.8)	7.6 (45.7)	12.8 (55.0)	15.1 (59.2)	6.5 (43.7)	2.4 (36.3)	−2.2 (28.0)	−6.1 (21.0)	−10.0 (14.0)
Average precipitation mm (inches)	39.4 (1.55)	48.8 (1.92)	90.2 (3.55)	96.9 (3.81)	125.6 (4.94)	166.5 (6.56)	195.2 (7.69)	112.3 (4.42)	162.1 (6.38)	93.0 (3.66)	56.4 (2.22)	46.2 (1.82)	1,230.3 (48.44)
Average precipitation days (≥ 1.0 mm)	5.6	7.2	9.4	9.3	9.6	11.4	11.4	8.7	9.8	6.9	6.4	6.2	101.9
Mean monthly sunshine hours	135.2	130.7	164.7	186.1	193.8	134.8	148.1	182.0	146.0	154.4	135.1	124.1	1,831.2
Source: Japan Meteorological Agency

=== Demographics ===
Per Japanese census data, the population of Takahashi in 2020 is 29,072 people. Takahashi has been conducting censuses since 1920.

Historical population
Year	Pop.	±%
1920	63,587	—
1925	64,425	+1.3%
1930	63,823	−0.9%
1935	63,717	−0.2%
1940	61,704	−3.2%
1945	75,570	+22.5%
1950	75,824	+0.3%
1955	74,013	−2.4%
1960	68,494	−7.5%
1965	60,554	−11.6%
1970	53,270	−12.0%
1975	49,330	−7.4%
1980	47,013	−4.7%
1985	45,760	−2.7%
1990	44,039	−3.8%
1995	43,115	−2.1%
2000	41,077	−4.7%
2005	38,799	−5.5%
2010	34,977	−9.9%
2015	32,075	−8.3%
2020	29,072	−9.4%
Takahashi population statistics

== History ==
Takahashi was part of ancient Bitchū Province. In the Kamakura period, a cadet branch of the Miura clan was appointed jito and constructed a castle in what is now the center of Takahashi city. From 1331, the area was under the control of Takahashi Muneyasu of the Miyoshi clan, who changed in the name of the castle to "Matsuyama". In the Muromachi period and Sengoku period, the area was highly contested as it was a central transportation hub in Bitchū Province. After the 1600 Battle of Sekigahara, the Tokugawa shogunate established Bitchū-Matsuyama Domain. In the Bakumatsu period, this domain was ruled by a cadet branch of the Itakura clan, and supported the shogunate in the Boshin War. Following the Meiji restoration, the town of Takahashi was established on June 1, 1889, with the creation of the modern municipalities system. It was raised to city status on May 1, 1954.

On October 1, 2004, Takahashi absorbed the town of Ukan (from Jōbō District), and the towns of Nariwa, Kawakami and Bitchū (all from Kawakami District) to become the new and expanded city of Takahashi. Kawakami District was dissolved as a result of this merger.

== Government ==
Takahashi has a mayor-council form of government with a directly elected mayor and a unicameral city legislature of 18 members. The city contributes one member to the Okayama Prefectural Assembly. In terms of national politics, the city is part of Okayama 3rd district of the lower house of the Diet of Japan.

== Economy ==
The economy of Takahashi is largely agricultural. Most of the farmland is located in the plateau area at an altitude of around 400 meters, and fruit trees and vegetables are actively cultivated taking advantage of the cool climate. Takahashi was originally one of the prefecture's leading leaf tobacco producing areas, but due to the shift to highly profitable grape and tomato crops, the shipment volume of leaf tobacco has decreased. Takahashi has also been a tea-producing area since ancient times. In addition to the large temperature difference between day and night, fog weakens ultraviolet rays and has the effect of suppressing bitterness, which helps grow high-quality tea leaves. In terms of poultry farming, there are large-scale poultry farms run by corporations outside the city scattered throughout the city,

== Education ==
Takahashi has 14 public elementary schools and six public junior high schools operated by the city government, and four public high schools operated by the Okayama Prefectural Board of Education. Kibi International University is a private university located in Takahashi.

=== Universities ===
- Kibi International University

=== High schools ===
- Okayama Takahashi High School
- Okayama Takahashi Jonan Senior High School
- Houkokugakusha High School

== Transportation ==
=== Railway ===
JR West (JR West) - Hakubi Line

- Bitchū-Hirose - Bitchū-Takahashi - Kinoyama - Bitchū-Kawamo - Hōkoku

=== Highway ===
- Okayama Expressway
- National Route 180
- National Route 313
- National Route 484

== Sister cities ==
- Troy, Ohio, United States, since 1990

== Local attractions ==
- Bitchū Matsuyama Castle
- Raikyū-ji, National Place of Science Beauty

== Trivia ==
In 2014, the city of Takahashi sponsored production of an anime series, Ai Tenchi Muyo!, to promote tourism to the region.

== Notable people ==
- Masato Sugi, (1880 – 1951) Japanese Navy (vice admiral) helped elevate Japan's naval power to the top rank in the world.
- Yusaku Yokoyama, (1882 – 1929) Professor at Waseda University, English Literature Scholar.
- Tatsuzō Ishikawa, (1905 – 1985) Japanese writer was once a candidate for the Nobel Prize in Literature.
- Shigeru Onishi, (1928 – 1994) Japanese visual artist. Held in the collection of the Museum of Modern Art, New York.
- Tadao Ogura, (1929 – ) Japanese art critic. Shigeru Onishi's classmate.
- Tōru Hashimoto, (1934 – ) Japanese entrepreneur. Former President of Fuji Bank and Chairman of Deutsche Securities.
- Kanji Morisawa, (1934 – ) Japanese entrepreneur. Former Executive Vice President of Itochu Corporation.
- Masao Tachiki, (1941 – 2018) 7th President of the Japan Volleyball Association.
- Akiko Fukai, (1943 – ) Japanese curator of fashion and textile arts.
- Akio Koike, (1946 – ) Japanese entrepreneur. both the 5th and 7th President, and the 3rd and 5th Chairman of JR Hokkaido.
- Hiroyuki Shimatani, (1953 – ) 3rd Chairman of Independent Administrative Institution National Museum.
- Shinji Hiramatsu, (1955 – ) Manga artist. His assistant was Yōichi Takahashi known for the author of Captain Tsubasa.
- Hiroyuki Mano, (1959 – ) Japanese doctor. Discovery of the lung cancer-causing gene EML4-ALK.
