= Kawakami, Okayama (Kawakami) =

Dissolved municipality in Okayama prefecture, Japan

Kawakami (川上町, Kawakami-chō) was a town located in Kawakami District, Okayama Prefecture, Japan.

As of 2003, the town had an estimated population of 3,853 and a density of 44.33 persons per km^{2}. The total area was 86.91 km^{2}.

On October 1, 2004, Kawakami, along with the town of Ukan (from Jōbō District), and the towns of Bitchū and Nariwa (all from Kawakami District), was merged into the expanded city of Takahashi and no longer exists as an independent municipality.
