= Masao Tachiki =

Japanese business executive

- 立木 正夫
- Born: March 31, 1941; Japan, Takahashi, Okayama Prefecture
- Died: August 6, 2018 (aged 77)
- Education: Takahashi High School→ University of Tokyo
- Alma mater: University of Tokyo
- Known for: Director at Suntory president of the Japan Volleyball Association

Masao Tachiki (Japanese: 立木 正夫, Hepburn: Tachiki Masao, March 31, 1941 – August 6, 2018) was a Japanese business executive. After serving as a director at Suntory, he became the 7th president of the Japan Volleyball Association. He also served as a municipal advisor in his hometown. He was a native of Takahashi, Okayama Prefecture.

== Biography ==
Masao Tachiki was born in Takahashi, Okayama in 1941. After graduating from Okayama Prefectural Takahashi High School, he entered the University of Tokyo, where he was a member of the university’s volleyball team.He graduated from the Faculty of Law in 1964 and joined Suntory the same year.

At Suntory, he was appointed to the board of directors in 1987 and took charge of advertising. In 1990, he contributed an article titled “Expectations for Mass Advertising” to the Japan Marketing Journal.

He was later promoted to managing director in 1991, and then to senior managing director in April 2003. From June 2003 to April 2011, he served as the president of the Japan Volleyball Association, and subsequently as a councilor from 2011 to 2015. He also held other prominent positions, including Chairman of the Alcohol Problems Committee of the Japan Spirits & Liqueurs Makers Association, and a member of the Central Council on Liquor under Japan’s National Tax Agency.

Tachiki died of heart failure at a hospital in Tokyo at 10:45 p.m. on August 6, 2018, at the age of 77.

== Episode ==
Kenji Shimaoka, a former volleyball player, expressed his condolences, saying: “As president of the Japan Volleyball Association, Mr. Tachiki dedicated himself to the management of the organization and the promotion and development of volleyball. He demonstrated foresight and leadership in spearheading organizational reform, especially during the transition of the association to a Public Interest Incorporated Foundation in February 2011. We are deeply grateful for his numerous contributions to the volleyball community.”

== Career ==
- March 1941 – Born in Takahashi, Okayama Prefecture, Japan.
- March 1959 – Graduated from Okayama Prefectural Takahashi High School.
- March 1964 – Graduated from the Faculty of Law, University of Tokyo.
- April 1964 – Joined Suntory Ltd.
- July 1982 – Appointed General Manager of the Marketing Department.
- July 1985 – Appointed Director of the Sales Planning Office.
- March 1987 – Appointed General Manager of the Information Systems Department.
- June 1987 – Appointed to the Board of Directors at Suntory at age 46.
- January 1991 – Appointed General Manager of the Beer Business Division.
- March 1991 – Promoted to Managing Director.
- September 2002 – Appointed Managing Director in charge of the Corporate Communications Division, Advertising Division, Secretariat, and Deliberation Office.
- April 2003 – Promoted to Senior Managing Director, also overseeing the Corporate Communications Division, Secretariat, and Deliberation Office.
- June 2003 – Appointed as the 7th President of the Japan Volleyball Association.
- February 2011 – Oversaw the transition of the Japan Volleyball Association into a Public Interest Incorporated Foundation.[1]
- April 2011 – Stepped down as President of the Japan Volleyball Association.
- April 2011 – Appointed as a Councilor of the Japan Volleyball Association.
- June 2015 – Retired from the role of Councilor at the Japan Volleyball Association.
- August 2018 – Passed away from heart failure at a hospital in Tokyo.
