= Masato Sugi =

Japanese naval officer (1880-1951)

- 杉 政人
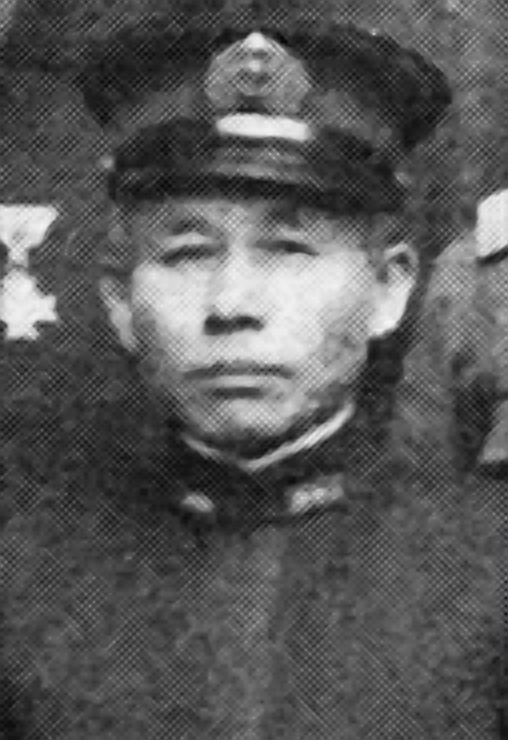
- Born: August 13, 1880; Takahashi, Okayama, Japan
- Died: November 19, 1951 (aged 71)
- Education: Imperial Japanese Naval Engineering Academy
- Military career
- Allegiance: Empire of Japan
- Branch: Imperial Japanese Navy
- Service years: 1902–1944
- Rank: Vice Admiral
- Nickname: Sugi Masando
- Known for: Japan's naval expansion and development
- Conflicts: Russo-Japanese War; Battle of Port Arthur; Battle of the Yellow Sea; Battle of Tsushima
- Awards: 1st Order of the Rising Sun; 4th Order of the Golden Kite; 5th Order of the Rising Sun
- Other work: President of Japan Steel Works

Masato Sugi (杉 政人, Sugi Masato; August 13, 1880 – November 19, 1951) was an Imperial Japanese Navy officer who held the final rank of vice admiral. He was born in Takahashi City, Okayama Prefecture. As a graduate of the Imperial Japanese Naval Engineering Academy, he was the first candidate for the rank of admiral from that institution.

== Early life and education ==
Masato Sugi was born in 1880 as the second son of Chūzaburō Sugi, a samurai of the Bitchū-Matsuyama Domain, and his wife, Yui. He graduated from the advanced course of Takahashi Boys' School in his hometown and passed the transfer examination to enter the second year of the newly established former Okayama Prefectural Takahashi Junior High School (now Okayama Prefectural Takahashi High School) as part of its first class.

After graduating, he moved alone to Yokosuka, Kanagawa Prefecture, and enrolled in the Naval Engineering Academy, one of the three main naval academies at the time (the other two being the Imperial Japanese Naval Academy and the Naval Accounting School). In 1903, he graduated from the Imperial Japanese Naval Engineering Academy as part of its 10th class.

== Career ==
=== Service in the Imperial Japanese Navy and Role in the Russo-Japanese War ===
After graduating from the Naval Engineering Academy, Masato Sugi was commissioned as an ensign in the Imperial Japanese Navy. During the Russo-Japanese War, he joined a suicide squad assigned to a perilous mission—deliberately sinking their own ships at the entrance of Port Arthur while under enemy fire, then escaping by boat. This operation carried an extremely high risk of death.

He participated in this mission twice: first on February 14, 1904, as the chief engineer of the Bushū Maru, and again on March 27 of the same year as the chief engineer of the Yoneyama Maru. His exceptional bravery during these missions was highly praised, earning him the Fourth Class Order of the Golden Kite and the Fifth Class Order of the Rising Sun with Silver Rays.

Three days before the first mission, on February 11, he sent a letter to his older brother, Sadatsugu, in Japan, enclosing a haiku:

"春寒や 二十四年の 腕だめし" meaning to "Spring’s chill lingers, A test of my twenty-four, Years of skill."

He was the youngest member of the suicide squad.

=== Career as a Naval Officer ===
As a junior engineering officer (Ensign, Engineering), Masato Sugi participated in the Russo-Japanese War and took part twice in the suicide squad for the Port Arthur blockade operation, being the youngest member. After the war, his distinguished service earned him an exceptional promotion, which was rare for a graduate of the Naval Engineering Academy.

From 1907 to 1908, he undertook a long-distance voyage to various Western countries. Upon returning to Japan, he served as an instructor at the Naval Engineering School. In 1911, he was rapidly promoted to lieutenant commander, engineering, and in 1912, he became the head of the machinery factory at the Sasebo Naval Arsenal. By 1915, he had risen to the rank of commander, engineering, at the young age of 35.

The following year, he was appointed as a shipbuilding supervisor, and in 1917, he was sent on an official mission to the United States. Later, he became an ordnance supervisor, and in 1919, the same year the Treaty of Versailles was signed, he was promoted to captain, engineering.

In 1923, he was appointed as the director of the Machinery Division at the Yokosuka Naval Arsenal, a place deeply connected to his days at the Imperial Japanese Naval Engineering Academy. Finally, in 1925, at the age of 45, he was promoted to rear admiral and became the director of the Fifth Department of the Naval Shipbuilding Headquarters.

He played a key role in Japan's naval expansion and development, serving in important positions such as chief of the Kure Naval Arsenal and director of the Naval Supply Bureau. He was instrumental in strengthening Japan's naval power, helping Japan surpass Western nations and become one of the world's leading naval forces. He was also the first engineering officer to be appointed as the chief of the Naval Shipbuilding Headquarters.

Although not an entirely non-career-track officer, his rise through the ranks as an engineering officer was considered highly unusual. He was regarded as the most promising candidate to become the first-ever full admiral from the engineering corps. However, in 1935, while serving as chief of the Naval Shipbuilding Headquarters, the Tomozuru Incident occurred. The newly commissioned torpedo boat Tomozuru capsized due to excessive equipment weight. As a result, he was forced to take responsibility and resign, being placed on the reserve list. This event prevented him from becoming the first admiral from the engineering corps.

Although the system allowed for engineering officers to be promoted to admiral from 1925 onward, in the end, the highest rank ever achieved by an engineering officer in the history of the Imperial Japanese Navy remained vice admiral.

=== Post-retirement and legacy ===
After retiring from the navy, Masato Sugi became the president of Japan Steel Works, contributing to the nation's economic development.

In April 1958, a monument honoring him, "The Monument of Masato Sugi," was erected within the grounds of Hachiman Shrine in Wada Town, Takahashi City, his birthplace. The inscription on the monument reads:

"With humility as his virtue, he never sought recognition. In his private life, he was a man of simplicity and unwavering integrity."

== Notable episode ==
In 1897, during the early years of former Okayama Prefectural Takahashi Junior High School (now Okayama Prefectural Takahashi High School), a school strike erupted. The incident escalated as students barricaded themselves in Hōkoku-rin and Kikyōgahara (now Nearoji, Ochiai Town, Takahashi City), leading to police intervention.

At the time, Masato Sugi was a third-year student, and through his efforts, the situation was resolved. This episode has since been passed down as a testament to his leadership and individual capability.
