= Ukan =

Dissolved municipality in Japan

Ukan (有漢町, Ukan-chō) was a town located in Jōbō District, Okayama Prefecture, Japan.

As of 2003, the town had an estimated population of 2,621 and a density of 56.14 persons per km^{2}. The total area was 46.69 km^{2}.

On October 1, 2004, Ukan, along with the towns of Bitchū, Kawakami and Nariwa (all from Kawakami District), was merged into the expanded city of Takahashi and no longer exists as an independent municipality.
