= Doberman Deka =

Japanese manga series

- Cover of the first tankōbon volume

ドーベルマン刑事 (Dōberuman Deka)
- Genre: Detective fiction
- Manga
- Written by: Buronson
- Illustrated by: Shinji Hiramatsu
- Published by: Shueisha
- Imprint: Jump Comics
- Magazine: Weekly Shōnen Jump
- Original run: 1975 – 1979
- Volumes: 29
- Manga

Shin Doberman Deka
- Written by: Buronson
- Illustrated by: Shinji Hiramatsu
- Published by: Nihon Bungeisha
- Magazine: Weekly Manga Goraku
- Original run: 2012 – 2013
- Volumes: 2

Doberman Deka (Japanese: ドーベルマン刑事; 'Doberman Cop') is a Japanese hardboiled manga series written by Buronson and illustrated by Shinji Hiramatsu. It was serialized in the Weekly Shōnen Jump manga magazine from 1975 (Issue 39) throughout 1979 (Issue 48), with the chapters collected into 29 tankōbon volumes. The manga has been adapted into two live-action films (the first starring Sonny Chiba and directed by Kinji Fukasaku) and a live-action television series.

A sequel titled Shin Doberman Deka (新ドーベルマン刑事; 'New Doberman Cop') was serialized in Weekly Manga Goraku from 2012 to 2013, and collected into two volumes.

== Plot summary ==
The protagonist is Joji Kano (加納 錠治, Kanō Jōji), a detective employed by the Tokyo Metropolitan Police Department's special crimes division, which handles serious criminal cases. His gun of choice is a customized .44 Magnum-caliber Ruger Blackhawk. Kano's harsh methods are the subject to criticism by the media, but he does not mind the reputation at all. While Kano has no pity for serious criminals, he holds a respect for children and elderly people, as well as former criminals who want to reform themselves for their prior misconducts.

At the beginning of the manga, the only members of the Special Crimes Division were Kano himself and Superintendent Hiroshi Nishitani (西谷 博, Nishitani Hiroshi), but they would gradually be joined by additional members such as Detective Tetsuji Miyatake (宮武 鉄二, Tetsuji Miyatake), a gang specialist who was transferred to Shinjuku from Osaka; female detective Ryuko Mimori (三森 竜子, Mimori Ryūko); and from the United States, female detective Judy Terao (ジュディー寺尾). While the series started with a hardboiled atmosphere, it gradually became more light-hearted as it progressed.

== Production ==
Buronson got the idea for Doberman Deka from the film Dirty Harry. When Doberman Deka was chosen to end serialization in a few months due to low rankings in the Weekly Shōnen Jump reader surveys, rookie Kazuhiko Torishima was assigned as its editor. Believing that Shinji Hiramatsu was good at action but bad at drawing women, Torishima gave him an issue of the actor and idol magazine Myojo and told him to model the face of a new policewoman character after that of the most popular idol at the time, Ikue Sakakibara. After which, Doberman Deka jumped from around seventeenth in the reader rankings to third.

== Media ==
=== Manga ===
Written by Buronson and illustrated by Shinji Hiramatsu, Doberman Deka was serialized in Weekly Shōnen Jump from 1975 (Issue 39) to 1979 (Issue 48). The chapters were collected into 29 tankōbon volumes. An aizōban edition was later published, as well as a bunkoban edition, which compressed the number of volumes to 18.

Buronson and Hiramatsu created a sequel titled Shin Doberman Deka (新ドーベルマン刑事; "New Doberman Cop") that was serialized in Weekly Manga Goraku from 2012 to 2013, and collected into 2 volumes.

=== First film ===
A live-action film version of Doberman Deka was released theatrically in Japan by Toei on July 2, 1977. The film was directed by Kinji Fukasaku and starred Sonny Chiba as Joji Kano.

=== TV series ===
A TV series based on the manga, titled Bakusō! Doberman Deka (爆走!ドーベルマン刑事; "Roar! Doberman Cop"), aired on TV Asahi affiliates in 1980. 22 episodes were produced, which aired from April 7 to October 27. Other than the main character Jōji Kanō (portrayed by Toshio Kurasawa), very few elements from the manga were adapted to the series. In the TV series, Kano was a member of a motorcycle cop unit.

==== Cast ====
- Toshio Kurosawa as Jōji Kanō
- Tatsurō Nadaka as Yuji Yabe
- Masato Hoshi as Ichirō Sakai
- Jirō Yabuki as Kyōsuke Hirata
- Chu Arai as Tetsunosuke Mori
- Etsuko Shiomi as Kaoru Igarashi
- Yosuke Natsuki as Masamichi Nishitani

=== Second film ===
A straight-to-video film titled The Doberman Cop was released by Gaga Communications in 1996 starring Riki Takeuchi in the title role.
