= Nariwa, Okayama =

Dissolved municipality in Okayama prefecture, Japan

Nariwa (成羽町, Nariwa-chō) was a town located in Kawakami District, Okayama Prefecture, Japan.

As of 2003, the town had an estimated population of 5,593 and a density of 68.32 persons per km^{2}. The total area was 81.87 km^{2}.

On October 1, 2004, Nariwa, along with the town of Ukan (from Jōbō District), and the towns of Bitchū and Kawakami (all from Kawakami District), was merged into the expanded city of Takahashi and no longer exists as an independent municipality.
