= Tadao Ogura =

Japanese art critic

- 小倉 忠夫
- Born: March 22, 1929 (age 97); Japan, Takahashi, Okayama Prefecture
- Education: Takahashi High School→ Imperial Naval Academy→ University of Tokyo
- Alma mater: University of Tokyo
- Father: Gyoka Ogura
- Awards: 3rd Order of the Rising Sun

Tadao Ogura (Japanese: 小倉 忠夫, Ogura Tadao, born March 22, 1929) is a Japanese art critic, known primarily for his work in the fields of printmaking and Western-style painting. Active from the 1960s through the 1970s, he published numerous critiques that significantly influenced the postwar Japanese art scene. He was born in Takahashi City, Okayama Prefecture. His father was Gyoka Ogura (Japanese: 小倉 魚禾, Ogura Gyoka), a painter.

== Biography ==
Tadao Ogura was born in 1929 in Takahashi City, Okayama Prefecture, as the son of the painter Gyoka Ogura. In 1941, he entered the former Takahashi Junior High School (now Okayama Prefectural Takahashi High School), where he was a classmate and friend of Shigeru Onishi, who later became known as an artist. Excelling academically, Ogura graduated early and entered the Imperial Japanese Naval Academy in April 1945, shortly before the end of World War II. After the war, he went on to study at the University of Tokyo, where he graduated in 1952 with a degree in aesthetics and art history from the Faculty of Letters.

After graduating from university, Ogura began working at the National Museum of Modern Art, Tokyo. In December 1962, he contributed an article titled "Printmaking as Contemporary Painting – The 3rd Tokyo International Print Biennale" to the art journal Bijutsu Techo (Japanese: 美術手帖) No. 213, in which he analyzed works exhibited at the Biennale and discussed the positioning of printmaking within the realm of contemporary painting. In November 1971, he contributed another article to Sansai (Japanese: 三彩) No. 280 titled "Western-style Painting and Printmaking (Postwar Japanese Art)," offering a detailed discussion on trends and characteristics of Western-style painting and printmaking in postwar Japan.

Recognized for his contributions to art criticism, Ogura was appointed Director of the National Museum of Art, Osaka in 1981 at the age of 52, and later became Director of the National Museum of Modern Art, Kyoto in 1986. In 1988, during his tenure at the Kyoto museum, Ogura participated in a roundtable discussion featured in the exhibition catalog for sculptor Yoshikuni Iida's retrospective held at the Mie Prefectural Art Museum. Joined by art critics Tetsuro Kagesato and Sadao Kato, the conversation delved deeply into Iida's works and artistic philosophy.

In addition to his work as a critic, Ogura also served as a jury member for several major art awards. From February 1991 to February 1992, he was a selection committee member for the 41st and 42nd Minister of Education, Culture, Sports, Science and Technology (MEXT) Art Encouragement Prizes, including the newcomers' category.

From 1995 to 1999, he served as Director of the Nagoya/Boston Museum of Fine Arts, and from 1998 to 2002, he held the position of Director at the Ohara Museum of Art. In 1999, at the age of 70, Ogura was awarded the Order of the Rising Sun, Gold Rays with Neck Ribbon (Third Class).

== Selected publications ==
- Milestones in Japanese Western-style Painting (日本洋画の道標), Kyoto Shimbun Publishing (京都新聞社), 1992.

== Co-authored and edited book ==
- Kodansha Edition: The Complete Works of Modern Japanese Painting (講談社版日本近代絵画全集), Vol. 8: Yumeji Takehisa, Kaiko Murayama, and Masajiro Sekine. Co-authored by Michiaki Kawakita. Kodansha (講談社), 1963.
- The Modern World Art Encyclopedia (近代世界美術全集), Vol. 12: The Development of Modern Japanese Art. Co-authored by Shinichi Nagai and Nobuya Nishizawa. Shakaishisōsha (社会思想社), 1964. (教養文庫)
- The Fateful Abstract Painter (宿命の抽象画家), Kazuo Sakata. Bijutsu Shuppansha (美術出版社), 1966.
- The Complete Works of Contemporary Japanese Art (現代日本美術全集), Vol.11: Shigeru Sakamoto. Shueisha (集英社), 1972.
- The Modern World Art Encyclopedia (現代世界美術全集), Vol.22: Ensor, Magritte. Shueisha (集英社), 1974.
- The Modern World Art Encyclopedia (現代世界美術全集), Vol.25: Salvador Dalí. Shueisha (集英社), 1974.
- Masterpieces by Great Masters (巨匠の名画), Vol.13: Yumeji Takehisa. Co-edited by Michiaki Kawakita, Gakken May 1976.
- Masterpieces of Japanese Art (日本の名画), Vol.5: Narashige Koide, Toshiyuki Hasegawa, and Tetsugorō Yorozu. Co-edited by Hideo Takumi and Tetsurō Kagesato. Kodansha (講談社), August 1977.
- Masterpieces of Japanese Art (日本の名画), Vol.18: Ryūzaburō Umehara. Chuokoron-Shinsha (中央公論社), July 1977.
- Contemporary Japanese Art (現代日本の美術), Vol.11: Printmaking. Shōgakkan (小学館), July 1978.
- The World Art Series (世界美術全集), Vol.25: Moreau, Redon. Co-authored by Tetsu Takemitsu. Shōgakkan (小学館), April 1979.
- Canvas: Masterpieces of Japanese Art (カンヴァス日本の名画), Vol.18: Ryūzaburō Umehara. Co-authored by Shōko Shirasu. Chuokoron-Shinsha (中央公論社), June 1979.
- The World Encyclopedia of Printmaking (世界版画美術全集), Vol. 4: Redon/Bresdin—The Allure of Fantasy and Symbolism (幻想と象徴の魅惑). Co-edited and co-authored by Otsuro Sakazaki. Kodansha (講談社), February 1981.
- Contemporary Japanese Prints (日本の現代版画). Co-edited and co-authored by Tamon Miki. Kodansha (講談社), July 1981.
- Japanese Watercolor Masterpieces (日本水彩画名作全集), Vol.3: Yumeji Takehisa. Daiichi Hōki Shuppan, September 1982.
- Modern Japanese Western-style Painting (近代日本洋画素描大系), Vol.2: Taisho Era. Kodansha (講談社), October 1984.
- 20th Century Japanese Art (20世紀日本の美術), Vol.12: Yumeji Takehisa / Shigeru Aoki. Co-edited by Hiroki Hashimoto. Shueisha (集英社), October 1986.
- 20th Century Japanese Art (20世紀日本の美術), Vol. 18: Shikō Munakata / Kiyoshi Hasegawa. Shueisha (集英社), July 1987.
- Japanese Art Museums (日本の美術館), Vol. 8: Osaka / Hyogo. Co-edited by Makoto Itō. Gyōsei (ぎょうせい), April 1987.
- The Complete Works of Matazo Kayama (加山又造全集), Vol. 3: Nudes / Prints. Gakken (学習研究社), February 1990.
- Cultural Heritage of the Showa Era (昭和の文化遺産), Vol. 4: Western-style Painting 2. Gyōsei (ぎょうせい), September 1990.
