= Bitchū-Hirose Station =

Railway station in Takahashi, Okayama Prefecture, Japan

Bitchū-Hirose Station 備中広瀬駅
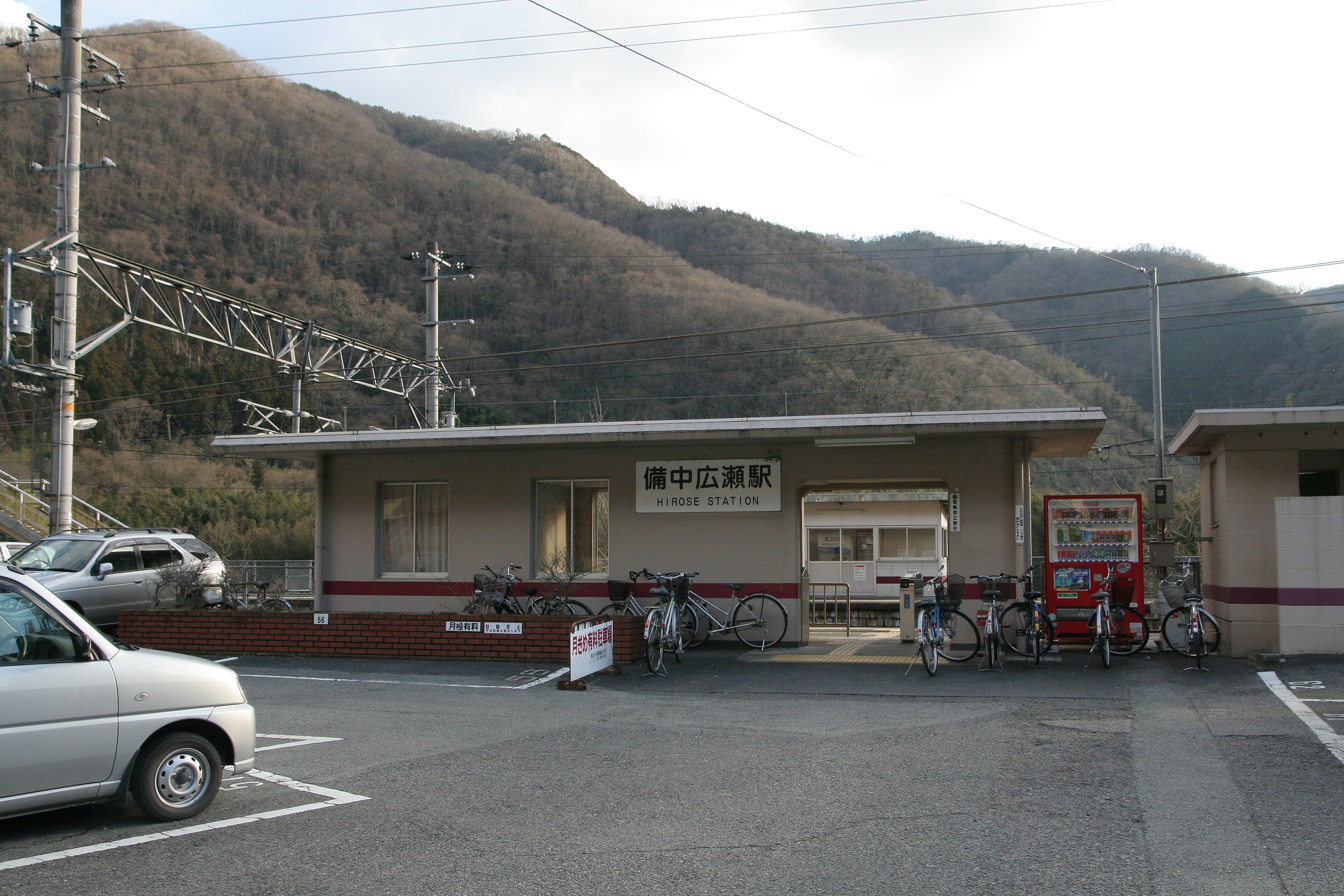
- Bitchū-Hirose Station, February 2008

General information
- Location: Matsuyama, Takahashi-shi, Okayama-ken 716-0051; Japan
- Coordinates: 34°45′30.68″N 133°36′24.09″E
- Operator: JR West
- Line: V Hakubi Line
- Distance: 29.6 km (18.4 miles) from Kurashiki
- Platforms: 2 side platforms
- Tracks: 2

Other information
- Status: Unstaffed
- Station code: JR-V11
- Website: Official website

History
- Opened: 20 June 1926

Passengers
- FY2019: 54 daily
Location
- Location within Okayama Prefecture Location within Japan

Bitchū-Hirose Station (備中広瀬駅, Bitchū-Hirose-eki) is a passenger railway station located in the city of Takahashi, Okayama Prefecture, Japan. It is operated by the West Japan Railway Company (JR West).

== Lines ==
Bitchū-Hirose Station is served by the Hakubi Line, and is located 29.6 kilometers from the terminus of the line at Kurashiki and 45.5 kilometers from Okayama.

== Station layout ==
The station consists of two ground-level opposed side platforms connected to the station building by a footbridge. The station is unattended.

=== Platforms ===
1	■ V Hakubi Line	for Kurashiki and Okayama
2	■ V Hakubi Line	for Niimi and Yonago

== Adjacent stations ==
«	Service	»
Hakubi Line
Minagi	-	Bitchū-Takahashi

== History ==
Bitchū-Hirose Station opened on June 20, 1926. With the privatization of the Japan National Railways (JNR) on April 1, 1987, the station came under the aegis of the West Japan Railway Company.

== Passenger statistics ==
In fiscal 2019, the station was used by an average of 54 passengers daily.

== Surrounding area ==
- Takahashi Municipal Tamagawa Elementary School
- Takahashi River
- Japan National Route 180

== See also ==
- List of railway stations in Japan
