= Kawakami District, Okayama =

Former district in Okayama prefecture, Japan

Kawakami (川上郡, Kawakami-gun) was a district located in Okayama Prefecture, Japan.

As of 2003, the district had an estimated population of 12,339 and a density of 45.47 persons per km^{2}. The total area was 271.34 km^{2}.

== Towns and villages ==
- Bitchū
- Kawakami
- Nariwa

== Merger ==
- On October 1, 2004 - the towns of Bitchū, Kawakami and Nariwa, along with the town of Ukan (from Jōbō District), were merged into the expanded city of Takahashi. Kawakami District was dissolved as a result of this merger.
