= Hiroyuki Shimatani =

- 島谷 弘幸
- Born: November 26, 1953 (age 72); Takahashi, Okayama, Japan
- Education: Tokyo University of Education (now the University of Tsukuba)
- Occupation: Scholar of Antique Art
- Organization: National Institutes for Cultural Heritage

Hiroyuki Shimatani (Japanese: 島谷 弘幸, Shimatani Hiroyuki; born November 26, 1953) is a Japanese scholar of antique art. After serving as the director of the Kyushu National Museum, he became the president of the National Institutes for Cultural Heritage. He is from Okayama Prefecture.
