= Ryūji Tanabe =

- 田邊 隆二
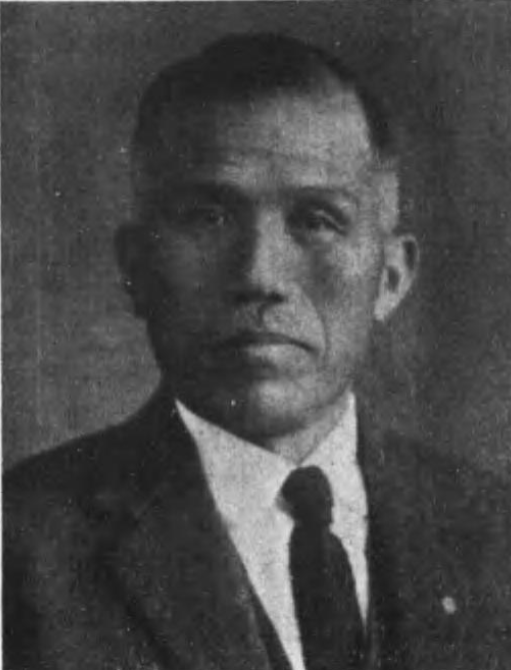
- Born: 23 January 1884; Kojima District, Okayama, Japan
- Died: 14 February 1945 (aged 61)
- Education: Takahashi High School; First Higher School; Tokyo Imperial University
- Alma mater: Tokyo Imperial University
- Occupations: bureaucrat businessman
- Known for: President of Kyoto Electric Power Company; President of Kansai Haiden
- Spouse: Shizuko
- Parents: Hikotarō (father); Uta (mother)

Ryūji Tanabe (Japanese: 田邊 隆二, Hepburn: Tanabe Ryūji; 23 January 1884 – 14 February 1945) was a Japanese bureaucrat in the Ministry of Communications and later a prominent businessman. A graduate of the University of Tokyo with high academic honors, he was awarded the prestigious silver watch by the government—a distinction known as the "Silver Watch Group." After joining the Ministry of Communications, he was considered a candidate for the position of Vice Minister. He went on to serve as president of Kyoto Electric Power Company, and later became the inaugural president of Kansai Haiden (now Kansai Electric Power Company). He was a native of Okayama Prefecture.

== Biography and career ==
=== Early life and education ===
Tanabe was born in 1884 in Kojima District, Okayama Prefecture, into the Tanabe family, a wealthy landowning lineage (High-net-worth individual) that had served as village headmen for generations. He was the second son of Hikotarō Tanabe and his wife Uta. He attended former Okayama Prefectural Takahashi Junior High School (now Okayama Prefectural Takahashi High School) and graduated in 1902.

He then enrolled in the British Law Department of the Literature Faculty at the First Higher School in Tokyo, where he studied alongside Seishiro Namba. After graduating in July 1905, he entered the Faculty of Law, Department of Political Science at Tokyo Imperial University. His classmates included Hosai Ozaki, Seishiro Namba, and Kozo Nimura. The four lived together in a shared residence in Tokyo known as the "Tekkō-juku". Tanabe graduated from the university in 1909.

=== Bureaucratic career ===
While still a student, Tanabe passed the higher civil service examination and was awarded the silver watch by the government in recognition of his excellence. He entered the Ministry of Communications upon graduation, where he rose through the ranks, serving in positions such as Director of the Inspection Bureau, Director-General of the General Affairs Department of the Management Bureau, Director of the Accounting Bureau, and Councilor of the Ministry (as Chief of the Documents Division in the Minister’s Secretariat). In 1924, at the age of 40, he became Director of the Communications Bureau, serving in Sapporo, Kumamoto, and Osaka, eventually being appointed simultaneously as Director of the Osaka Communications Bureau and Chief Judge of the Osaka Regional Maritime Tribunal.

In 1927, he was promoted to Director-General of the Postal Insurance Bureau. At the time, he had been strongly recommended by then Minister of Communications Keisuke Mochizuki for the position of Vice Minister.

=== Transition to business ===
Despite his promising bureaucratic career, Tanabe was repeatedly urged by Hiroshi Tanaka, then president of Kyoto Electric Power Company, to join the company as a managing director with a view to future presidency. Compelled by Tanaka's earnest request, Tanabe made the bold decision to leave the bureaucracy after nearly 20 years of service, joining Kyoto Electric in 1928 at age 44.

=== Kyoto Electric Power Company ===
At Kyoto Electric, Tanabe demonstrated outstanding management skills while supporting the aging President Tanaka. He quickly gained recognition in the electric power industry and was promoted to vice president in 1931, just three years after joining. During this time, he was awarded Senior Fourth Rank and the Fourth Class Order of Merit by the Japanese government. As Tanaka aged, Tanabe effectively took over leadership of the company.

Although the power industry faced significant hardships during the Great Depression, Kyoto Electric under Tanabe’s leadership managed to maintain high dividend payouts and grew from a regional company into one of Japan’s "Big Six" electric power companies. At the time, it was said that former bureaucrats often managed conservatively, lacking flexibility, but Tanabe defied this norm with an aggressive and proactive management style. His personality was known to be bold and generous, winning the respect of his employees.

He maintained close ties with Michio Itano, a fellow Takahashi High School alumnus who was then a department head at Kyoto Electric. In 1938, the company celebrated its 50th anniversary, and in 1940, it acquired Fukui Electric, Nango Electric, and Taisho Electric. Upon President Tanaka’s retirement, Tanabe became president of Kyoto Electric in 1941.

=== Kansai Haiden and wartime role ===
Due to wartime national policies, Kyoto Electric was dissolved under the Wartime Electricity Distribution Control Order in 1942. Its assets were absorbed into the newly established Kansai Haiden. Kansai Haiden was created in September 1941 by order of the Minister of Communications under the control law and brought together 14 electricity suppliers, including six private firms—Japan Electric Generation and Transmission, Japan Electric Power, Toho Electric Power, Nankai Hydraulic Electric, Ujigawa Electric, and Kyoto Electric—as well as five railway companies and three city-owned utilities in Osaka, Kobe, and Kyoto.

Although Ujigawa Electric was a larger company than Kyoto Electric, Tanabe, with his strong Ministry of Communications background and status as a former Vice Minister candidate, was appointed as the first president of Kansai Haiden in 1942 at the age of 58. Arata Hori, president of Ujigawa Electric, was made vice president. Under Tanabe's leadership and in accordance with ministry directives, the company completed the second phase of integration in July 1943.

Kansai Haiden relied on Nippon Electric Generation and Transmission for about 90% of its power supply. Among its senior executives was Hisagorō Mori, a fellow Takahashi High School alumnus and later the first vice president of Kansai Electric Power.

Tanabe remained president of Kansai Haiden through the end of World War II. He died in office on February 14, 1945, at the age of 61.
