= Tatsuzō Ishikawa =

Japanese writer

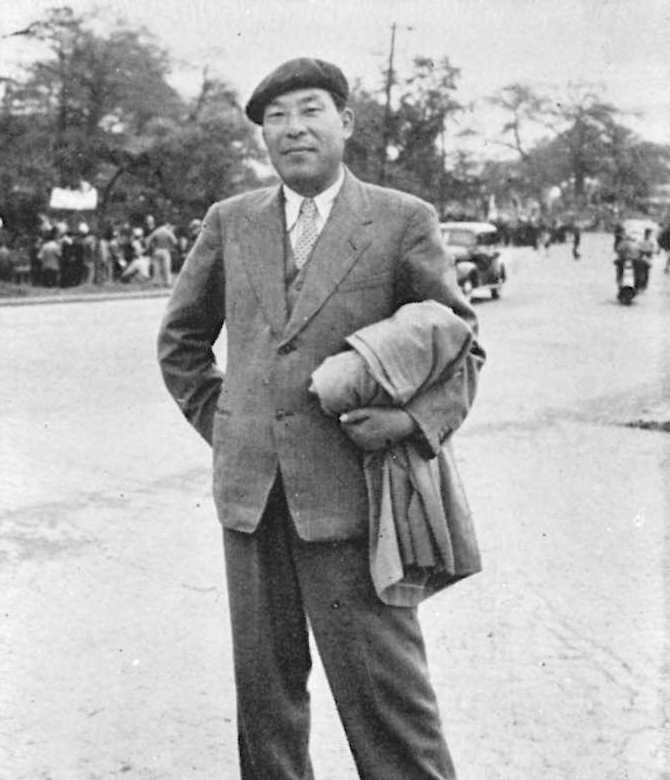
- Born: July 2, 1905; Japan, Yokote, Akita Prefecture
- Died: January 31, 1985 (aged 79); Japan, Tokyo
- Writing career
- Notable work: Sōbō
- Notable awards: 1st Akutagawa Prize for Sōbō

Tatsuzō Ishikawa (Japanese: 石川 達三, Ishikawa Tatsuzō; July 2, 1905 – January 31, 1985) was a Japanese writer. He was the first winner of the Akutagawa Prize.

== Biography ==
Born in Yokote, Akita Prefecture, Japan, Ishikawa was raised in several places, including Kyoto and Okayama Prefecture.

Due to his father's job transfers and career changes, they moved to Narayama Honshinmachi Kamicho 35, Akita City in 1908 when he was two years old, then to Ōimachi, Ebara District, Tokyo Prefecture (now Shinagawa Ward, Tokyo) when he was seven years old in 1912, and later that September to Takahashi Town, Kamibō District, Okayama Prefecture (now Takahashi City). In 1914, when he was nine, he lost his mother and was sent to live with his uncle, Rokurō Ishikawa, in Tokyo. However, in 1915, his father remarried, and he was raised by his stepmother, Sei.

He graduated elementary school at the top of his class and took the entrance exam for the Tokyo Prefectural First Middle School but failed. He then attended a higher elementary school for one year and, in 1919, entered Okayama Prefectural Takahashi High School, where his father was a deputy principal. When he was in his third year, his father's transfer led him to transfer to Kanzei high School in Okayama City as a fourth-year student, where he graduated. He took the entrance exam for the Sixth High School but failed. During the one-year period he spent preparing for exams, he read works by Shimazaki Tōson, Émile Zola, Anatole France, and others.

He entered Waseda University's literature department but left before graduating. In 1930 he left Japan for Brazil and worked on a farm. Ishikawa won the first Akutagawa Prize in 1935 for Sōbō (蒼氓), a novel based on his experiences in Brazil.

In December 1937, Ishikawa was dispatched to Nanjing as a special reporter by the Chūō Kōron publishing company. After landing in Shanghai, he arrived in Nanjing in January 1938, weeks after the fall of the city to the Imperial Japanese Army. Embedded within an army unit later connected to the Nanking Massacre, Ishikawa wrote a fictional account (Ikite iru Heitai 生きている兵隊) of the atrocities suffered by Chinese civilians as well as the widespread pessimism of the Japanese soldiers. Due to its controversial subject matter, nearly one-fourth of its contents was censored even before it was scheduled to be serialized in Chūō Kōron. Still, the magazine was removed from circulation the day it was published and Ishikawa, the editor, and three publishers were arrested under the 23rd article of the "Newspaper Law" (Shinbunshi Hō 新聞紙法) for "causing disturbance to peace and order". Ishikawa was sentenced to four months imprisonment and placed on probation for three years. Ikite iru Heitai was not to be published in its entirety until after the war, in December 1945. For a complete English translation, see Soldiers Alive (Trans. Zeljko Cipris, Honolulu: University of Hawai'i Press, 2003).

In 1946, he unsuccessfully ran for a seat in the lower house of the Diet of Japan in the 1946 Japanese general election. Ishikawa continued to be an active writer after the war, and in 1969, he won the Kikuchi Kan Prize (Kikuchi Kan Shō 菊池寛賞) for his contributions to Japanese literature. He was an active member of the Japan Art Academy. He died in Tokyo in 1985.

== Bibliography ==
- Sōbō (蒼氓) (1935)
- Ikite iru Heitai (生きている兵隊, Soldiers Alive) – 1945 / English translation: 2003
- Kinkanshoku (金鐶蝕) (1966)

== Awards ==
- 1935 – Akutagawa Prize for Sōbō (蒼氓)
- 1969 – Kikuchi Kan Prize
