= Norihiro Nakajima =

Japanese manga artist

Norihiro Nakajima (中島徳博, Nakajima Norihiro) (1950 – August 28, 2014) was a Japanese manga artist. He did about 20 series. He died of colorectal cancer.
