= Japan Volleyball Association =

Sports governing body

- Sport: Volleyball
- Jurisdiction: Japan
- Abbreviation: JVA
- Founded: 1927
- Affiliation: FIVB
- Affiliation date: 1951
- Regional affiliation: AVC
- Affiliation date: 1952
- Headquarters: Sendagaya, Shibuya-ku, Tokyo
- President: Shunichi Kawai
- Operating income: JP¥ 2.034 billion (2021)

Official website
- www.jva.or.jp/en/
- (Japan)

The Japan Volleyball Association (JVA) is the governing body for volleyball in Japan. It was founded in 1927, and has been a member of FIVB since 1951. It is also a member of the Asian Volleyball Confederation. The JVA is responsible for organizing the Japan men's national volleyball team and Japan women's national volleyball team.

== History ==
The Greater Japan Volleyball Association was established in 1927 and joined the Greater Japan Sports Association. The volleyball association was succeeded by the Japan Volleyball Association (JVA) in 1946.

In 1951, the JVA joined the FIVB.

The JVA was approved to become an incorporated foundation on August 27, 1973. It later became a public interest incorporated foundation on February 1, 2011.

== Presidents ==
President	Term	
President	From	To
Ryōzō Hiranuma	1928	1942
Michio Sasaki	1943	1947
Masakazu Nishikawa	1948	1976
Shoji Iki	1978	1989
Yasutaka Matsudaira	1989	1995
Tsutomu Murai	1995	2003
Masao Tachiki	2003	2011
Taisaburo Nakano	2011	2013
Hamu Yuichiro	2013	2015
Kenji Kimura	2015	2017
Kenji Shimaoka	2017	2022
Shunichi Kawai	2022	incumbent

== National teams ==
For details please refer to main articles for dedicated teams.

=== Men's ===
- Japan men's national under-19 volleyball team
- Japan men's national under-21 volleyball team
- Japan men's national volleyball team

=== Women's ===
- Japan women's national under-19 volleyball team
- Japan women's national under-21 volleyball team
- Japan women's national volleyball team

== Competitions ==
=== Current title holders ===
Competition	Season	Champions	Title	Runners-up
League
V.League Division 1	2021–22	Suntory Sunbirds	9th	Wolfdogs Nagoya
V.League Division 2	2021–22	Voreas Hokkaido		Fujitsu Kawasaki Red Spirits
V.League Division 3	2021–22	Aisin Tealmare		Kinki Club Sfida
Cup
Emperor's Cup	2022	JTEKT Stings	2nd	Toray Arrows
Kurowashiki Tournament	2021	Suntory Sunbirds		JTEKT Stings

Competition	Season	Champions	Title	Runners-up
Women's league
V.League Division 1	2021–22	Hisamitsu Springs	8th	JT Marvelous
V.League Division 2	2021–22	Brilliant Aries		Gunma Bank Green Wings
Women's cup
Empress's Cup	2022	Hisamitsu Springs	1st	Toray Arrows
Kurowashiki Tournament	2021	Toray Arrows		PFU BlueCats

Source: Vleague, JVA

== Sponsors ==
Year(s)	Companies	Ref.
2022–2025	Capcom	
unknown–present	Hisamitsu	
unknown–present	ANA	
unknown–present	Chuo-Nittochi	
unknown–present	Mynavi	
unknown–present	Marudai Food	
unknown–present	JTEKT	
unknown–present	Japanet	
unknown–present	Asics	
unknown–present	Mizuno	
unknown–present	Penalty	
unknown–present	Mikasa	
unknown–present	Molten	
unknown–present	Tezuka Osamu Official	
