= Graduate School of Medicine and Faculty of Medicine, Kyoto University =

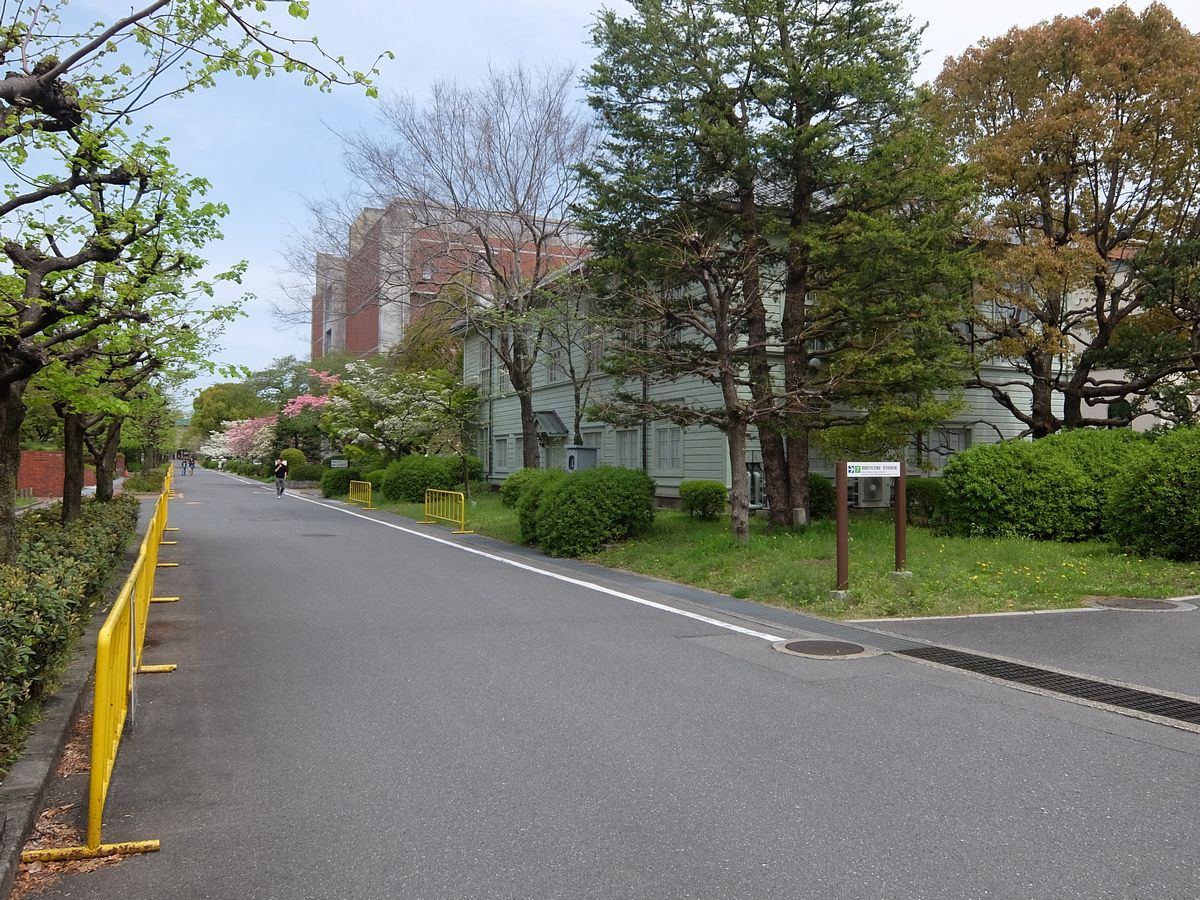
Medical campus

Graduate School of Medicine and Faculty of Medicine (京都大学大学院医学研究科・医学部) is one of the schools at Kyoto University. The Faculty and the Graduate School operate as one.

According to the QS World University Rankings for Medicine 2020, Kyoto University is ranked second in Japan after the University of Tokyo.

Professor Shinya Yamanaka received the Nobel Prize in Physiology or Medicine in 2012 for his work on iPS cells. Also, Prof. Emer. Tasuku Honjo, who is also a graduate of Kyoto University, won the Nobel Prize in Physiology or Medicine in 2018 for his discovery and theory of immune checkpoint inhibitors.

== History ==
In 1899, College of Medicine (医科大学) and its hospital (now Kyoto University Hospital) was established Imperial University of Kyoto. In 1919, The college is renamed Faculty of Medicine (医学部).

Established in 1939, the School of Medicine's Department of Pharmacy became an independent Faculty of Pharmaceutical Sciences and Graduate School of Pharmaceutical Sciences in 1960.

In 2003, the Health Sciences (now Human Health Sciences) Department was added.

== Organization ==
The Faculty has two undergraduate courses and four graduate courses.

=== Faculty of Medicine ===
Faculty of Medicine has two undergraduate courses.

- Medicine (医学科) – 6-year Undergraduate medical school
- Human Health Sciences (人間健康科学科) – 4-year undergraduate course in health sciences

=== Graduate School of Medicine ===
Graduate School of Medicine has 4 graduate courses.

- Medicine and Medical Science (医学・医科学専攻) – Master's and Doctor's
- Public Health (社会健康医学系専攻) – Master of Public Health and Doctor's
- Human Health Sciences (人間健康科学系専攻) – Master's and Doctor's
- Kyoto-McGill International Collaborative Program in Genomic Medicine (京都大学・マギル大学ゲノム医学国際連携専攻) – Doctor's

=== Kyoto University Hospital ===
Kyoto University Hospital (京都大学医学部附属病院) is a Clinical Research Core Hospital designated by the Ministry of Health, Labor and Welfare.

== Kyoto University School of Public Health ==
Kyoto University School of Public Health (SPH, 京都大学 大学院医学研究科 社会健康医学系専攻), established in 2000, is Japan's oldest public health professional school. It is a division of the Graduate School of Medicine.

SPH has double degree agreements with Chulalongkorn University and Mahidol University in Thailand, Universiti Malaya in Malaysia, and National Taiwan University in Taiwan.

== College of Medical Technology ==
College of Medical Technology, Kyoto University (京都大学医療技術短期大学部) was a junior college of nursing, medical laboratory science, physiotherapy, occupational therapy, and midwifery. The college was absorbed into the Faculty and Graduate School in 2007.

== Alumni association ==
- Shirankai (芝蘭会) – Medical Student Alumni
- Shiryokai (紫緑会) – Health Science Student Alumni

== See also ==
- Medical education in Japan
