= List of international volleyball players =

This is a list of top international volleyball players.

== A ==
- (Australia) Foluke Akinradewo
- (Brazil) Carolina Albuquerque
- (Bulgaria) Todor Aleksiev
- (Brazil) Ana Ida Alvares
- (Brazil) Thiago Soares Alves
- (Brazil) Dante Amaral
- (Italy) Andrea Anastasi
- (United States) Matt Anderson
- (France) Stéphane Antiga
- (Poland) Halina Aszkiełowicz
- (Serbia) Aleksandar Atanasijević
- (Brazil) Décio de Azevedo
- (Thailand) Wilavan Apinyapong
- (Azerbaijan) Odina Bayramova

== B ==
- (India) Ballu
- (United States) Lloy Ball
- (Bulgaria) Petya Barakova
- (Italy) (Poland) Michele Baranowicz
- (United States) Michelle Bartsch-Hackley
- (Italy) Andrea Bari
- (Poland) Zbigniew Bartman
- (India) Abdul Basith
- (France) Christina Bauer
- (Poland) Michał Bąkiewicz
- (Poland) Bronisław Bebel
- (Poland) Agnieszka Bednarek-Kasza
- (Algeria) Sarra Belhocine
- (Cuba) Regla Bell
- (Poland) Izabela Bełcik
- (Netherlands) Edwin Benne
- (United States) Alaina Bergsma
- (Italy) Lorenzo Bernardi
- (Italy) Franco Bertoli
- (Poland) Mateusz Bieniek
- (Italy) Emanuele Birarelli
- (Netherlands) Peter Blangé
- (Poland) Grzegorz Bociek
- (Italy) Dante Boninfante
- (Italy) Marco Bonitta
- (Netherlands) Rob Bontje
- (Poland) Ryszard Bosek
- (Serbia) Tijana Bošković
- (Netherlands) Ron Boudrie
- (Brazil) Camila Brait
- (Bulgaria) Georgi Bratoev
- (Bulgaria) Valentin Bratoev
- (Serbia) Aleksa Brđović
- (Poland) Hanna Busz
- (Poland) Rafał Buszek
- (Thailand) Wanna Buakaew

== C ==
- (Philippines) Fille Cainglet
- (United States) Lauren Carlini
- (Philippines) Tots Carlos
- (Brazil) Sheilla Castro
- (Costa Rica) Alexander Chamberlain
- (Poland) Lidia Chmielnicka
- (Argentina) Facundo Conte
- (Argentina) Hugo Conte
- (Netherlands) Albert Cristina
- (Puerto Rico) Áurea Cruz
- (Dominican Republic) Bethania de la Cruz
- (Serbia) Konstantin Čupković
- (Poland) Krystyna Czajkowska
- (Poland) Patryk Czarnowski
- (United States) Micah Christenson

== D ==
- (United States) Annie Drews
- (Philippines) Rachel Daquis
- (Turkey) Neslihan Darnel
- (Cuba) Joel Despaigne
- (Philippines) Ella de Jesus
- (Philippines) Rhea Dimaculangan
- (Bulgaria) Gergana Dimitrova
- (Bulgaria) Nasya Dimitrova
- (Netherlands) Kay van Dijk
- (Netherlands) Laura Dijkema
- (Turkey) Eda Erdem Dündar
- (Poland) Fabian Drzyzga
- (Poland) Eleonora Dziękiewicz
- (India) K. J. Kapil Dev

== E ==
- (Japan) Yukiko Ebata
- (Dominican Republic) Karla Echenique
- (Italy) Paola Egonu
- (Dominican Republic) Lisvel Elisa Eve
- (Brazil) Murilo Endres
- (Brazil) Gustavo Endres
- (Russia) Yevgeniya Estes

== F ==
- (Spain) Miguel Ángel Falasca
- (Philippines) Kim Fajardo
- (Philippines) Jem Ferrer
- (Bulgaria) Strashimira Filipova
- (Brazil) Luiz Felipe Fonteles
- (Netherlands) Nico Freriks
- (Japan) Mai Fujii

== G ==
- (Poland) Piotr Gacek
- (Philippines) Ara Galang
- (Philippines) Jema Galanza
- (Poland) Katarzyna Gajgał-Anioł
- (Russia) Ekaterina Gamova
- (Brazil) Fernanda Garay
- (Peru) Rosa García Rivas
- (Poland) Wiesław Gawłowski
- (India) Jimmy George
- (Netherlands) Dirk-Jan van Gendt
- (Philippines) Dzi Gervacio
- (Brazil) Giba
- (Italy) Andrea Giani
- (Italy) Simone Giannelli
- (Poland) Krzysztof Gierczyński
- (Poland) Małgorzata Glinka
- (Poland) Arkadiusz Gołaś
- (Philippines) Jovelyn Gonzaga
- (Netherlands) Bas van de Goor
- (Netherlands) Mike van de Goor
- (Netherlands) Guido Görtzen
- (Bulgaria) Svetoslav Gotsev
- (Netherlands) Rob Grabert
- (Italy) Pasquale Gravina
- (Serbia) Nikola Grbić
- (Serbia) Vladimir Grbić
- (France) Jenia Grebennikov
- (Poland) Marcel Gromadowski
- (Germany) Georg Grozer
- (Poland) Piotr Gruszka
- (Poland) Wojciech Grzyb
- (Iran) Farhad Ghaemi
- (Iran) Amir Ghafour
- (Iran) Adel Gholami
- (Bulgaria) Kristina Guncheva

== H ==
- (Japan) Kanari Hamaguchi
- (United States) Tayyiba Haneef
- (Japan) Naoko Hashimoto
- (Finland) Janne Heikkinen
- (Netherlands) Henk-Jan Held
- (Japan) Kanako Hirai
- (Philippines) Gretchen Ho
- (United States) Dax Holdren
- (Japan) Makiko Horai
- (Netherlands) Robert Horstink
- (Japan) Eri Hosoda
- (Philippines) Patrick Hernandez
- (Thailand) Amporn Hyapha
- (United States) Micha Hancock

== I ==
- (Poland) Krzysztof Ignaczak
- (Japan) Ai Inden
- (Japan) Akiko Ino
- (Japan) Kotoe Inoue
- (Japan) Kaori Inoue
- (Japan) Nanami Inoue
- (Japan) Yuki Ishikawa
- (Japan) Yūki Ishikawa
- (Bulgaria) Evgeni Ivanov
- (Serbia) Marko Ivović
- (Japan) Nana Iwasaka

== J ==
- (Canada) Thomas Jarmoc
- (Poland) Jakub Jarosz
- (India) Tom Joseph

== K ==
- (Poland) Joanna Kaczor
- (Poland) Klaudia Kaczorowska
- (Poland) Łukasz Kadziewicz
- (Germany) Lukas Kampa
- (Japan) Maiko Kano
- (Japan) Miyuki Kano
- (Bulgaria) Mariya Karakasheva
- (Poland) Marek Karbarz
- (Japan) Masae Kasai
- (Japan) Kyoko Katashita
- (Japan) Chihiro Kato
- (Japan) Yuki Kawai
- (Japan) Kana Kawakami
- (Japan) Megumi Kawamura
- (Japan) Seiko Kawamura
- (Bulgaria) Matey Kaziyski
- (South Korea) Kim Yeon-koung
- (Japan) Saori Kimura
- (United States) Karch Kiraly
- (Netherlands) Marko Klok
- (Poland) Karol Kłos
- (Poland) Jakub Kochanowski
- (Bulgaria) Plamen Konstantinov
- (Netherlands) Wytze Kooistra
- (Poland) Grzegorz Kosok
- (Poland) Michał Kubiak
- (Poland) Bartosz Kurek
- (Japan) Megumi Kurihara
- (Thailand) Malika Kanthong

== L ==
- (United States) Jordan Larson
- (Philippines) Denden Lazaro
- (Netherlands) Misha Latuhihin
- (Netherlands) Marrit Leenstra
- (Germany) Grit Lehmann
- (Poland) Wilfredo Leon
- (Poland) Maria Liktoras
- (Brazil) Dani Lins
- (Serbia) Srećko Lisinac
- (Brazil) Lucas Eduardo Lóh
- (Thailand) Wanitchaya Luangtonglang
- (Poland) Lech Łasko
- (Poland) Grzegorz Łomacz
- (Cuba) Mireya Luis

== M ==
- (Philippines) Aiza Maizo
- (Philippines) Aby Maraño
- (France) (Poland) Nicolas Marechal
- (Cuba) Leonel Marshall Jr.
- (Dominican Republic) Niverka Marte
- (United States) Jennifer Martz
- (Japan) Yuko Maruyama
- (Japan) Hiroko Matsuura
- (Philippines) (United States) Kalei Mau
- (United States) Misty May-Treanor
- (Brazil) Thaisa Menezes
- (Netherlands) Olof van der Meulen
- (Serbia) Brankica Mihajlović
- (Japan) Aya Mikami
- (Poland) Mateusz Mika
- (Poland) Robert Milczarek
- (Serbia) Ivan Miljković
- (Japan) Saki Minemura
- (Poland) Joanna Mirek
- (Japan) Yuko Mitsuya
- (Japan) Yukari Miyata
- (Philippines) Isa Molde
- (Japan) Jungo Morita
- (Poland) Marcin Możdżonek
- (Poland) Agata Mróz-Olszewska
- (Poland) Dawid Murek
- (Iran) Mohammad Mousavi (volleyball)
- (Iran) Saeid Marouf
- (Iran) Shahram Mahmoudi
- (Philippines) Jia Morado
- (Iran) Mohammadjavad Manavinezhad

== N ==
- (Japan) Miyu Nagaoka
- (Japan) Kumi Nakada
- (Japan) Tomomi Nakao
- (Japan) Hitomi Nakamichi
- (Japan) Ikumi Narita
- (Japan) Katsutoshi Nekoda
- (France) Earvin N'Gapeth
- (Poland) Barbara Niemczyk
- (Bulgaria) Nikolay Nikolov
- (Bulgaria) Vladimir Nikolov
- (Bulgaria) Simeon Nikolov
- (Japan) Mariko Nishiwaki
- (Japan) Keiki Nishiyama
- (Japan) Yuji Nishida
- (Poland) Piotr Nowakowski
- (Netherlands) Reinder Nummerdor
- (Dominican Republic) Sidarka Núñez

== O ==
- (Japan) Motoko Obayashi
- (United States) Kim Oden
- (United States) Chiaka Ogbogu
- (Serbia) Maja Ognjenović
- (Japan) Seiji Oko
- (Japan) Tomoko Okano
- (Japan) Kanako Omura
- (Italy) Alessia Orro
- (Japan) Ai Otomo
- (Japan) Kana Oyama
- (Japan) Miki Oyama
- (Japan) Shuka Oyama
- (United States) Joseph Orrin

== P ==
- (Argentina) Esteban de Palma
- (Czech Republic) Kristyna Pastulova
- (Bulgaria) Chono Penchev
- (Bulgaria) Nikolay Penchev
- (Bulgaria) Rozalin Penchev
- (Brazil) Paula Pequeno
- (Brazil) Natália Pereira
- (Peru) Gabriela Pérez Del Solar
- (Netherlands) Celeste Plak
- (Poland) Daniel Pliński
- (Poland) Anna Podolec
- (Philippines) Ish Polvorosa
- (Netherlands) Jan Posthuma
- (United States) William Priddy
- (Poland) Robert Prygiel

== R ==
- (Bulgaria) Dobriana Rabadzhieva
- (Philippines) Aurea Francesca Racraquin
- (Dominican Republic) Prisilla Rivera
- (Philippines) Mika Reyes
- (Brazil) Bernardo Rezende
- (Brazil) Bruno Rezende
- (Netherlands) Brecht Rodenburg
- (Brazil) Rodrigão
- (Brazil) Mônica Rodrigues
- (Dominican Republic) Cosiri Rodríguez
- (Dominican Republic) Jeoselyna Rodriguez Santos
- (Dominican Republic) Cindy Rondón
- (Dominican Republic) Gina del Rosario
- (Poland) Milena Rosner
- (France) Antonin Rouzier
- (Poland) Michał Ruciak
- (Bulgaria) Hristina Ruseva
- (United States) Aaron Russell
- (Poland) Mirosław Rybaczewski

== S ==
- (Bulgaria) Teodor Salparov
- (Japan) Kumiko Sakino
- (Japan) Saori Sakoda
- (Philippines) Dindin Santiago
- (Philippines) Jaja Santiago
- (Brazil) Sérgio Santos
- (Japan) Arisa Satō
- (Japan) Yuka Sakurai
- (Japan) Ayako Sana
- (Thailand) Patcharee Sangmuang
- (Japan) Yuko Sano
- (Japan) Miya Sato
- (Japan) Risa Sato
- (Netherlands) Richard Schuil
- (Bulgaria) Georgi Seganov
- (Netherlands) (Israel) Avital Selinger
- (United States) Eugene Selznick
- (Japan) Aki Shibata
- (Japan) Takako Shirai
- (Brazil) Sidão
- (Poland) Edward Skorek
- (Poland) Katarzyna Skowrońska-Dolata
- (Bulgaria) Todor Skrimov
- (Netherlands) Lonneke Slöetjes
- (Bulgaria) Tsvetan Sokolov
- (Russia) Lyubov Sokolova (volleyball)
- (Philippines) Charo Soriano
- (Philippines) Pau Soriano
- (Netherlands) Kim Staelens
- (United States) Clayton Stanley
- (Japan) Kaoru Sugayama
- (Japan) Sachiko Sugiyama
- (Japan) Haruka Sunada
- (Japan) Yuko Suzuki
- (Poland) Grzegorz Szymański
- (Poland) Magdalena Śliwa
- (Poland) Dorota Świeniewicz
- (Poland) Sebastian Świderski
- (Thailand) Onuma Sittirak

== T ==
- (Philippines) Angeli Tabaquero
- (Peru) Cecilia Tait
- (Japan) Asako Tajimi
- (Japan) Arisa Takada
- (Japan) Midori Takahashi
- (Japan) Miyuki Takahashi
- (Japan) Yoshie Takeshita
- (Japan) Nanae Takizawa
- (Japan) Yuki Tanaka
- (Japan) Masami Taniguchi
- (Japan) Ran Takahashi
- (Netherlands) Martin Teffer
- (Germany) Ferdinand Tille
- (France) Kévin Tillie
- (France) Laurent Tillie
- (Bulgaria) Mira Todorova
- (Bulgaria) Zhana Todorova
- (United States) Logan Tom
- (Japan) Nene Tomita
- (Thailand) Nootsara Tomkom
- (Poland) Berenika Tomsia
- (Japan) Kotomi Tosaki
- (Netherlands) Jeroen Trommel
- (Japan) Chie Tsuji
- (Japan) Honami Tsukiji
- (Japan) Yumiko Tsuzuki
- (Bulgaria) Hristo Tsvetanov
- (France) Samuel Tuia
- (Italy) Dragan Travica
- (Thailand) Pleumjit Thinkaow

== U ==
- (Japan) Akiko Uchida
- (Bulgaria) Nikolay Uchikov
- (Japan) Mai Uemura
- (Argentina) Jon Uriarte
- (Argentina) Nicolás Uriarte
- (India) K. Udayakumar

== V ==
- (Philippines) Alyssa Valdez
- (Dominican Republic) Annerys Vargas
- (Bulgaria) Elitsa Vasileva
- (Brazil) Leandro Vissotto
- (Belgium) Pieter Verhees
- (India) Cyril C. Valloor

== W ==
- (United States) Kerri Walsh Jennings
- (Poland) Anna Werblińska
- (Poland) Wanda Wiecha
- (Poland) Marcin Wika
- (Poland) Michał Winiarski
- (Poland) Łukasz Wiśniewski
- (Poland) Dominik Witczak
- (Poland) Mariusz Wlazły
- (Poland) Wojciech Włodarczyk
- (Poland) Paweł Woicki
- (Poland) Damian Wojtaszek
- (Poland) Tomasz Wójtowicz
- (United States) Justine Wong-Orantes
- (Poland) Andrzej Wrona

== Y ==
- (Japan) Masahiro Yanagida
- (Bulgaria) Lina Yanchulova
- (Bulgaria) Petia Yanchulova
- (Bulgaria) Eva Yaneva
- (Japan) Yoshiko Yano
- (Japan) Juri Yokoyama
- (Japan) Masami Yokoyama
- (Bulgaria) Boyan Yordanov
- (Bulgaria) Viktor Yosifov

== Z ==
- (Poland) Paweł Zagumny
- (Poland) Maciej Zajder
- (Poland) Paweł Zatorski
- (Poland) Mariola Zenik
- (Bulgaria) Antonina Zetova
- (United States) / (Japan) Yoko Zetterlund
- (Bulgaria) Andrey Zhekov
- (Bulgaria) Dimitar Zlatanov
- (Bulgaria) (Italy) Hristo Zlatanov
- (Netherlands) Ronald Zoodsma
- (Netherlands) Ron Zwerver
- (Poland) Łukasz Żygadło
- (Iran) Farhad Zarif
- (Iran) Hamzeh Zarini
- (Italy) Ivan Zaytsev
- (Italy) Andrea Zorzi
- (China) Zhu Ting
