= 2023 Asian Women's Club Volleyball Championship squads =

This article shows the rosters of all participating teams at the 2023 Asian Women's Club Volleyball Championship in Vĩnh Phúc, Vietnam.

== Pool A ==
=== Hisamitsu Springs ===
The following is the roster of the Japanese club Hisamitsu Springs in the 2023 Asian Club Championship.

Head coach: (Japan) Shingo Sakai

No.	Name	Date of birth	Height	Weight	Spike	Block
4	(Japan) Asuka Hamamatsu	22 December 1998	1.81 m (5 ft 11 in)	78 kg (172 lb)	304 cm (120 in)	302 cm (119 in)
9	(Japan) Manami Mandai	17 May 1998	1.68 m (5 ft 6 in)	59 kg (130 lb)	281 cm (111 in)	261 cm (103 in)
10	(Japan) Riho Otake (C)	23 December 1993	1.83 m (6 ft 0 in)	68 kg (150 lb)	305 cm (120 in)	294 cm (116 in)
11	(Japan) Erika Sakae	3 April 1991	1.68 m (5 ft 6 in)	51 kg (112 lb)	273 cm (107 in)	267 cm (105 in)
13	(Japan) Akari Shirasawa	7 March 1998	1.64 m (5 ft 5 in)	61 kg (134 lb)	287 cm (113 in)	275 cm (108 in)
17	(Japan) Ayane Kitamado	6 July 2004	1.82 m (6 ft 0 in)	63 kg (139 lb)	300 cm (120 in)	288 cm (113 in)
20	(Japan) Ayaka Araki	9 February 2001	1.84 m (6 ft 0 in)	80 kg (180 lb)	295 cm (116 in)	285 cm (112 in)
21	(Japan) Sae Nakajima	18 June 1999	1.74 m (5 ft 9 in)	67 kg (148 lb)	293 cm (115 in)	
22	(Japan) Megumi Fukazawa	17 April 2003	1.76 m (5 ft 9 in)	68 kg (150 lb)	302 cm (119 in)	288 cm (113 in)
23	(Japan) Mika Yoshitake	20 April 2003	1.82 m (6 ft 0 in)	75 kg (165 lb)	300 cm (120 in)	284 cm (112 in)
24	(Japan) Minami Nishimura	23 March 2000	1.68 m (5 ft 6 in)	65 kg (143 lb)	284 cm (112 in)	

=== King Whale Taipei ===
The following is the roster of the Taiwanese club King Whale Taipei in the 2023 Asian Club Championship.

Head coach: (Chinese Taipei) Teng Yen-min

No.	Name	Date of birth	Height	Weight	Spike	Block
4	(Chinese Taipei) Chen Li-jung	23 February 2001	1.67 m (5 ft 6 in)	58 kg (128 lb)	273 cm (107 in)	265 cm (104 in)
5	(Chinese Taipei) Wu Fang-yu	9 January 2000	1.70 m (5 ft 7 in)	58 kg (128 lb)	295 cm (116 in)	280 cm (110 in)
6	(Chinese Taipei) Chen Li-jun	7 March 2003	1.70 m (5 ft 7 in)	61 kg (134 lb)	289 cm (114 in)	276 cm (109 in)
7	(Chinese Taipei) Lin Shu-ho	6 February 1999	1.71 m (5 ft 7 in)	62 kg (137 lb)	298 cm (117 in)	285 cm (112 in)
8	(Chinese Taipei) Chen Jia-man	27 July 1999	1.72 m (5 ft 8 in)	62 kg (137 lb)	294 cm (116 in)	284 cm (112 in)
9	(Chinese Taipei) Kan Ko-hui	9 March 2002	1.88 m (6 ft 2 in)	86 kg (190 lb)	312 cm (123 in)	305 cm (120 in)
10	(Chinese Taipei) Chen Chieh	1 December 2000	1.65 m (5 ft 5 in)	63 kg (139 lb)	276 cm (109 in)	268 cm (106 in)
11	(Brazil) Beatriz Flávio de Carvalho	18 December 1998	1.77 m (5 ft 10 in)	75 kg (165 lb)	298 cm (117 in)	295 cm (116 in)
12	(Chinese Taipei) Liao Yi-jen (C)	8 June 1997	1.65 m (5 ft 5 in)	51 kg (112 lb)	265 cm (104 in)	275 cm (108 in)
13	(Chinese Taipei) Tsai Qin-yao	20 September 1998	1.79 m (5 ft 10 in)	71 kg (157 lb)	283 cm (111 in)	280 cm (110 in)
14	(Brazil) Gabriela Oliveira Fabiano	8 January 1994	1.91 m (6 ft 3 in)	73 kg (161 lb)	305 cm (120 in)	310 cm (120 in)
16	(Chinese Taipei) Wang Yu-wen	24 January 2004	1.76 m (5 ft 9 in)	65 kg (143 lb)	286 cm (113 in)	282 cm (111 in)
18	(Chinese Taipei) Qiu Shi-qing	25 January 2004	1.52 m (5 ft 0 in)	49 kg (108 lb)	224 cm (88 in)	228 cm (90 in)
20	(Chinese Taipei) Lai Xiang-chen	19 March 1995	1.53 m (5 ft 0 in)	53 kg (117 lb)	260 cm (100 in)	257 cm (101 in)

=== Paykan Tehran ===
The following is the roster of the Iranian club Paykan Tehran in the 2023 Asian Club Championship.

Head coach: (Iran) Fatemeh Rashidi

No.	Name	Date of birth	Height	Weight	Spike	Block
1	(Iran) Maryam Habibi	17 April 2001	1.80 m (5 ft 11 in)	73 kg (161 lb)	300 cm (120 in)	288 cm (113 in)
2	(Iran) Fatemeh Amini	19 October 1997	1.78 m (5 ft 10 in)	64 kg (141 lb)	300 cm (120 in)	285 cm (112 in)
3	(Iran) Samaneh Siavashi	4 July 1993	1.76 m (5 ft 9 in)	72 kg (159 lb)	270 cm (110 in)	260 cm (100 in)
4	(Iran) Soudabeh Bagherpour	16 September 1990	1.85 m (6 ft 1 in)	72 kg (159 lb)	296 cm (117 in)	288 cm (113 in)
7	(Iran) Mona Ashofteh	2 January 2001	1.84 m (6 ft 0 in)	68 kg (150 lb)	315 cm (124 in)	300 cm (120 in)
8	(Iran) Fatemeh Manzouri	6 November 2004	1.69 m (5 ft 7 in)	66 kg (146 lb)	299 cm (118 in)	293 cm (115 in)
9	(Iran) Mona Deris Mahmoudi	24 January 1993	1.85 m (6 ft 1 in)	95 kg (209 lb)	300 cm (120 in)	288 cm (113 in)
10	(Iran) Zahra Karimi	15 February 2002	1.85 m (6 ft 1 in)	77 kg (170 lb)	303 cm (119 in)	295 cm (116 in)
11	(Iran) Mahsa Kadkhoda (C)	22 June 1993	1.80 m (5 ft 11 in)	77 kg (170 lb)	300 cm (120 in)	288 cm (113 in)
12	(Iran) Negar Hashemi	3 May 2007	1.65 m (5 ft 5 in)	57 kg (126 lb)		
13	(Iran) Negar Kiani	8 June 1992	1.71 m (5 ft 7 in)	63 kg (139 lb)		
14	(Iran) Pouran Zare	23 October 1983	1.87 m (6 ft 2 in)	73 kg (161 lb)	315 cm (124 in)	300 cm (120 in)
16	(Iran) Zahra Moghani	6 January 2002	1.80 m (5 ft 11 in)	71 kg (157 lb)	280 cm (110 in)	268 cm (106 in)
18	(Iran) Zahra Rezaei	29 May 2004	1.80 m (5 ft 11 in)	67 kg (148 lb)	298 cm (117 in)	293 cm (115 in)

=== Sport Center 1 ===
The following is the roster of the Vietnamese national team (under the alias Sport Center 1) in the 2023 Asian Club Championship.

Head coach: (Vietnam) Nguyễn Tuấn Kiệt

No.	Name	Date of birth	Height	Weight	Spike	Block
1	(Vietnam) Lê Thị Thanh Liên	7 April 1993	1.53 m (5 ft 0 in)	46 kg (101 lb)	225 cm (89 in)	220 cm (87 in)
3	(Vietnam) Trần Thị Thanh Thúy (C)	12 November 1997	1.93 m (6 ft 4 in)	73 kg (161 lb)	310 cm (120 in)	292 cm (115 in)
8	(Vietnam) Phạm Thị Nguyệt Anh	13 December 1998	1.74 m (5 ft 9 in)	60 kg (130 lb)	293 cm (115 in)	285 cm (112 in)
9	(Vietnam) Trần Thị Bích Thủy	11 December 2000	1.84 m (6 ft 0 in)	60 kg (130 lb)	303 cm (119 in)	297 cm (117 in)
11	(Vietnam) Hoàng Thị Kiều Trinh	11 February 2001	1.74 m (5 ft 9 in)	58 kg (128 lb)	286 cm (113 in)	281 cm (111 in)
12	(Vietnam) Nguyễn Khánh Đang	3 October 2000	1.58 m (5 ft 2 in)	56 kg (123 lb)		
14	(Vietnam) Võ Thị Kim Thoa	18 March 1998	1.73 m (5 ft 8 in)	67 kg (148 lb)	274 cm (108 in)	270 cm (110 in)
15	(Vietnam) Nguyễn Thị Trinh	9 May 1997	1.80 m (5 ft 11 in)	68 kg (150 lb)	290 cm (110 in)	270 cm (110 in)
16	(Vietnam) Vi Thị Như Quỳnh	16 April 2002	1.75 m (5 ft 9 in)	70 kg (150 lb)	290 cm (110 in)	285 cm (112 in)
17	(Vietnam) Đoàn Thị Xuân	17 May 1997	1.82 m (6 ft 0 in)	65 kg (143 lb)	300 cm (120 in)	290 cm (110 in)
19	(Vietnam) Đoàn Thị Lâm Oanh	6 July 1998	1.77 m (5 ft 10 in)	67 kg (148 lb)	289 cm (114 in)	285 cm (112 in)
20	(Vietnam) Trần Tú Linh	10 July 1999	1.79 m (5 ft 10 in)	64 kg (141 lb)	288 cm (113 in)	276 cm (109 in)
22	(Vietnam) Lý Thị Luyến	22 February 1999	1.90 m (6 ft 3 in)	52 kg (115 lb)	308 cm (121 in)	298 cm (117 in)
23	(Vietnam) Đinh Thị Trà Giang	9 May 1992	1.82 m (6 ft 0 in)	70 kg (150 lb)	300 cm (120 in)	290 cm (110 in)

== Pool B ==
=== Altay ===
The following is the roster of the Kazakhstani club Altay in the 2023 Asian Club Championship.

Head coach: (Russia) Yury Panchenko

No.	Name	Date of birth	Height	Weight	Spike	Block
2	(Kazakhstan) Sana Anarkulova (C)	21 July 1989	1.89 m (6 ft 2 in)	72 kg (159 lb)	310 cm (120 in)	305 cm (120 in)
4	(Serbia) Andjela Veselinović	5 February 1999	1.80 m (5 ft 11 in)	65 kg (143 lb)	295 cm (116 in)	285 cm (112 in)
5	(Russia) Irina Malkova	5 January 1989	1.92 m (6 ft 4 in)	75 kg (165 lb)	320 cm (130 in)	310 cm (120 in)
7	(Kazakhstan) Zarina Sitkazinova	20 March 1993	1.81 m (5 ft 11 in)	66 kg (146 lb)	300 cm (120 in)	290 cm (110 in)
9	(Kazakhstan) Valeriya Chumak	20 September 1994	1.89 m (6 ft 2 in)	72 kg (159 lb)	310 cm (120 in)	305 cm (120 in)
10	(Kazakhstan) Irina Kenzhebayeva	20 February 1992	1.82 m (6 ft 0 in)	68 kg (150 lb)	300 cm (120 in)	290 cm (110 in)
11	(Kazakhstan) Yelizaveta Meister	1 November 1997	1.77 m (5 ft 10 in)	65 kg (143 lb)	295 cm (116 in)	285 cm (112 in)
14	(Kazakhstan) Svetlana Parukova	21 September 1990	1.86 m (6 ft 1 in)	75 kg (165 lb)	305 cm (120 in)	295 cm (116 in)
15	(Kazakhstan) Madina Beket	6 November 1999	1.64 m (5 ft 5 in)	56 kg (123 lb)	275 cm (108 in)	265 cm (104 in)
16	(Kazakhstan) Tatyana Nikitina	15 January 2001	1.87 m (6 ft 2 in)	73 kg (161 lb)	310 cm (120 in)	305 cm (120 in)
17	(Serbia) Sara Sakradžija	25 March 1994	1.86 m (6 ft 1 in)	72 kg (159 lb)	300 cm (120 in)	300 cm (120 in)
18	(Kazakhstan) Kristina Anikonova	5 January 1991	1.85 m (6 ft 1 in)	71 kg (157 lb)	305 cm (120 in)	300 cm (120 in)
19	(Kazakhstan) Saniya Balagazinova	16 November 2002	1.78 m (5 ft 10 in)	66 kg (146 lb)	295 cm (116 in)	290 cm (110 in)
21	(Kazakhstan) Tomiris Sagimbayeva	1 August 2001	1.71 m (5 ft 7 in)	59 kg (130 lb)	275 cm (108 in)	265 cm (104 in)

=== Diamond Food–Fine Chef ===
The following is the roster of the Thai club Diamond Food–Fine Chef in the 2023 Asian Club Championship.

Head coach: (Thailand) Kittikun Sriutthawong

No.	Name	Date of birth	Height	Weight	Spike	Block
1	(Thailand) Wiranyupa Inchan	23 May 2002	1.82 m (6 ft 0 in)	85 kg (187 lb)	285 cm (112 in)	275 cm (108 in)
8	(Thailand) Kaewkalaya Kamulthala	7 August 1994	1.78 m (5 ft 10 in)	68 kg (150 lb)	291 cm (115 in)	281 cm (111 in)
9	(Thailand) Sasiwimol Saengpan	27 January 1995	1.77 m (5 ft 10 in)	64 kg (141 lb)	294 cm (116 in)	283 cm (111 in)
10	(Thailand) Pattiya Juangjan	16 January 1998	1.73 m (5 ft 8 in)	65 kg (143 lb)	291 cm (115 in)	281 cm (111 in)
11	(Thailand) Sasipaporn Janthawisut	10 June 1997	1.78 m (5 ft 10 in)	67 kg (148 lb)	288 cm (113 in)	283 cm (111 in)
12	(Thailand) Supattra Kaewpanya	19 August 2002	1.75 m (5 ft 9 in)	66 kg (146 lb)	286 cm (113 in)	283 cm (111 in)
13	(Thailand) Nootsara Tomkom (C)	7 July 1985	1.69 m (5 ft 7 in)	55 kg (121 lb)	275 cm (108 in)	260 cm (100 in)
14	(Thailand) Wipawee Srithong	28 January 1999	1.73 m (5 ft 8 in)	66 kg (146 lb)	287 cm (113 in)	278 cm (109 in)
15	(Thailand) Narissara Kaewma	11 April 1996	1.58 m (5 ft 2 in)	54 kg (119 lb)	235 cm (93 in)	235 cm (93 in)
17	(Thailand) Gullapa Piampongsan	17 March 1991	1.76 m (5 ft 9 in)	61 kg (134 lb)	296 cm (117 in)	279 cm (110 in)
18	(Serbia) Nataša Čikiriz	26 June 1995	1.93 m (6 ft 4 in)	70 kg (150 lb)	300 cm (120 in)	290 cm (110 in)
19	(Thailand) Tichakorn Boonlert	22 March 2001	1.80 m (5 ft 11 in)	78 kg (172 lb)	294 cm (116 in)	287 cm (113 in)
25	(Thailand) Jidapa Nahuanong	22 February 2002	1.72 m (5 ft 8 in)	58 kg (128 lb)	277 cm (109 in)	265 cm (104 in)
99	(Thailand) Kanjana Kuthaisong	11 April 1997	1.72 m (5 ft 8 in)	57 kg (126 lb)	287 cm (113 in)	275 cm (108 in)

=== Hip Hing ===
The following is the roster of the Hong Kong club Hip Hing in the 2023 Asian Club Championship.

Head coach: (Hong Kong) Wong Suk Yee

No.	Name	Date of birth	Height	Weight	Spike	Block
1	(Hong Kong) Ng Ki Tung	31 August 1992	1.65 m (5 ft 5 in)	55 kg (121 lb)	270 cm (110 in)	260 cm (100 in)
3	(Hong Kong) Fung Tsz San	13 July 1994	1.76 m (5 ft 9 in)	67 kg (148 lb)	275 cm (108 in)	270 cm (110 in)
4	(Hong Kong) Yick Wing Sum	7 October 2000	1.77 m (5 ft 10 in)	68 kg (150 lb)	283 cm (111 in)	275 cm (108 in)
5	(Hong Kong) Ho Kin Yiu	4 March 1996	1.84 m (6 ft 0 in)	68 kg (150 lb)	292 cm (115 in)	288 cm (113 in)
6	(Hong Kong) Leung Hiu Laam	10 November 1990	1.60 m (5 ft 3 in)	63 kg (139 lb)	255 cm (100 in)	250 cm (98 in)
8	(Hong Kong) Chim Wing Lam	8 November 1997	1.73 m (5 ft 8 in)	62 kg (137 lb)	295 cm (116 in)	280 cm (110 in)
10	(Hong Kong) Tse Lai Lam	29 November 2002	1.65 m (5 ft 5 in)	58 kg (128 lb)	270 cm (110 in)	260 cm (100 in)
11	(Hong Kong) Pang Wing Nam (C)	9 June 1998	1.64 m (5 ft 5 in)	59 kg (130 lb)	260 cm (100 in)	255 cm (100 in)
12	(Hong Kong) Pang Wing Lam	11 February 1997	1.74 m (5 ft 9 in)	67 kg (148 lb)	288 cm (113 in)	275 cm (108 in)
14	(Hong Kong) Tam Wing Tung	14 February 1996	1.72 m (5 ft 8 in)	54 kg (119 lb)	280 cm (110 in)	270 cm (110 in)
15	(Hong Kong) Cherry Fu	20 June 1997	1.75 m (5 ft 9 in)	70 kg (150 lb)	275 cm (108 in)	270 cm (110 in)
17	(Hong Kong) Yip Sin Yi	11 March 2003	1.75 m (5 ft 9 in)	68 kg (150 lb)	275 cm (108 in)	270 cm (110 in)
21	(Hong Kong) Lau Hei Lam	14 January 1989	1.74 m (5 ft 9 in)	63 kg (139 lb)	275 cm (108 in)	270 cm (110 in)
99	(Hong Kong) Au Yung Ching	25 November 1985	1.66 m (5 ft 5 in)	62 kg (137 lb)	260 cm (100 in)	255 cm (100 in)

=== Khuvsgul Erchim ===
The following is the roster of the Mongolian club Khuvsgul Erchim in the 2023 Asian Club Championship.

Head coach: (Mongolia) Kherlen Batdorj

No.	Name	Date of birth	Height	Weight	Spike	Block
1	(Mongolia) Khongorzul Gan-Ochir	12 December 1996	1.78 m (5 ft 10 in)	67 kg (148 lb)	295 cm (116 in)	285 cm (112 in)
2	(Mongolia) Enkhlen Purevsuren	15 May 2001	1.81 m (5 ft 11 in)	60 kg (130 lb)	300 cm (120 in)	292 cm (115 in)
3	(Mongolia) Khandsuren Gantogtokh	26 April 1997	1.82 m (6 ft 0 in)	68 kg (150 lb)	302 cm (119 in)	295 cm (116 in)
4	(Mongolia) Enkhnaran Ganbold	16 July 2002	1.74 m (5 ft 9 in)	65 kg (143 lb)	290 cm (110 in)	275 cm (108 in)
5	(Mongolia) Saruulgerel Ganbaatar	10 November 1990	1.71 m (5 ft 7 in)	63 kg (139 lb)	288 cm (113 in)	284 cm (112 in)
8	(Mongolia) Baasanjav Naranbaatar	27 July 2001	1.56 m (5 ft 1 in)	52 kg (115 lb)	260 cm (100 in)	230 cm (91 in)
9	(Mongolia) Khosbayar Lkhagwadorj (C)	2 October 1996	1.64 m (5 ft 5 in)	64 kg (141 lb)	270 cm (110 in)	265 cm (104 in)
11	(Mongolia) Sosorburam Dashdavaa	12 January 1995	1.60 m (5 ft 3 in)	49 kg (108 lb)	270 cm (110 in)	267 cm (105 in)
13	(Mongolia) Khuslen Enkhbold	7 April 2002	1.77 m (5 ft 10 in)	57 kg (126 lb)	275 cm (108 in)	265 cm (104 in)
14	(Mongolia) Temuulen Sansarbold	6 September 2002	1.79 m (5 ft 10 in)	64 kg (141 lb)	288 cm (113 in)	285 cm (112 in)
15	(Mongolia) Ninjbolor Battur	30 January 2000	1.81 m (5 ft 11 in)	59 kg (130 lb)	305 cm (120 in)	297 cm (117 in)
17	(Mongolia) Bayanjargal Jigjidkhorol	12 August 2000	1.76 m (5 ft 9 in)	67 kg (148 lb)	300 cm (120 in)	290 cm (110 in)
18	(Mongolia) Tsedevnamber Tsetsen-Ochir	18 August 2000	1.70 m (5 ft 7 in)	55 kg (121 lb)	280 cm (110 in)	275 cm (108 in)
19	(Mongolia) Munkhzaya Namshir	23 August 2002	1.81 m (5 ft 11 in)	65 kg (143 lb)	283 cm (111 in)	277 cm (109 in)

=== Liaoning Donghua ===
The following is the roster of the Chinese club Liaoning Donghua in the 2023 Asian Club Championship.

Head coach: (Japan) Toshiaki Yoshida

No.	Name	Date of birth	Height	Weight	Spike	Block
1	(China) Wang Meiyi	13 August 1995	1.87 m (6 ft 2 in)	73 kg (161 lb)	285 cm (112 in)	280 cm (110 in)
2	(China) Xu Duoxinning	30 March 2004	1.64 m (5 ft 5 in)	54 kg (119 lb)	262 cm (103 in)	242 cm (95 in)
3	(China) Cheng Wen	6 May 2000	1.98 m (6 ft 6 in)	86 kg (190 lb)	306 cm (120 in)	299 cm (118 in)
4	(China) Sun Xiaoxuan	18 February 2000	1.86 m (6 ft 1 in)	70 kg (150 lb)	285 cm (112 in)	280 cm (110 in)
5	(China) Shi Bingtong	6 February 1998	1.89 m (6 ft 2 in)	71 kg (157 lb)	290 cm (110 in)	285 cm (112 in)
7	(China) Sun Haiping (C)	23 May 1996	1.80 m (5 ft 11 in)	64 kg (141 lb)	270 cm (110 in)	265 cm (104 in)
9	(China) Wang Yifei	14 September 2002	1.83 m (6 ft 0 in)	71 kg (157 lb)	303 cm (119 in)	293 cm (115 in)
12	(China) Zheng Mingyu	19 October 2002	1.79 m (5 ft 10 in)	60 kg (130 lb)	287 cm (113 in)	280 cm (110 in)
13	(China) Wang Lujia	2 June 1998	1.87 m (6 ft 2 in)	73 kg (161 lb)	295 cm (116 in)	285 cm (112 in)
15	(China) Zhang Shengnan	28 November 2004	1.73 m (5 ft 8 in)	72 kg (159 lb)	275 cm (108 in)	255 cm (100 in)
16	(China) Lin Xinyu	15 August 1997	1.83 m (6 ft 0 in)	68 kg (150 lb)	290 cm (110 in)	285 cm (112 in)
17	(China) Han Yingxiang	1 July 1997	1.84 m (6 ft 0 in)	80 kg (180 lb)	285 cm (112 in)	280 cm (110 in)
18	(China) Sun Yuqing	18 February 2001	1.89 m (6 ft 2 in)	65 kg (143 lb)	290 cm (110 in)	280 cm (110 in)
20	(China) Du Qiushuang	16 September 2006	1.95 m (6 ft 5 in)	85 kg (187 lb)	295 cm (116 in)	290 cm (110 in)
