= Mizuho Ishida =

Japanese volleyball player (born 1988)

Personal information
- Full name: Mizuho Ishida
- Nickname: Mizuho
- Born: January 22, 1988 (age 38); Tomioka City, Gunma, Japan
- Height: 1.74 m (5 ft 8 1/2 in)
- Weight: 67 kg (148 lb)
- Spike: 301 cm (119 in)

Volleyball information
- Position: Opposite
- Current club: Retired

National team
Japan
Medal record
Women's volleyball
Representing Japan
World Championship
Bronze medal – third place	2010 Japan	National team
Asian Championship
Bronze medal – third place	2009 Hanoi	Team

Mizuho Ishida (石田瑞穂 Ishida Mizuho, born January 22, 1988) is a former Japanese volleyball player who played for Hisamitsu Springs, Denso Airybees, Takefuji Bamboo, and the Japan women's national volleyball team.

== Clubs ==
- (Japan) Takasaki University of Commerce High School
- (Japan) Takefuji Bamboo (2006–2009)
- (Japan) Hisamitsu Springs (2009–2015)
- (Japan) Denso Airybees (2015–2019)

== National team ==
- (Japan) National team (2009-)

== Awards ==
=== Individual ===
- 2011-2012 V.Premier League - Excellent player award, Best 6.

=== Team ===
- 2011-2012 V.Premier League - Runner-Up, with Hisamitsu Springs.
- 2012 - Empress's Cup - Champion, with Hisamitsu Springs.
- 2012-2013 V.Premier League - Champion, with Hisamitsu Springs.
- 2013 - Japan-Korea V.League Top Match - Champion, with Hisamitsu Springs.
- 2013 - Kurowashiki All Japan Volleyball Tournament - Champion, with Hisamitsu Springs.
- 2014 Asian Club Championship - Champion, with Hisamitsu Springs.

=== National team ===
- 2010 World Championship - Bronze medal
- 2011 Montreux Volley Masters - Champion
