= 2008 Asian Women's Club Volleyball Championship =

2008 Asian Club Championship
Tournament details
- Host country: Vietnam
- Dates: 1–7 June
- Teams: 8
- Venue: 1 (in 1 host city)

Final positions
- Champions: (China) Tianjin Bridgestone (3rd title)

Tournament awards
- MVP: (China) Li Shan

The 2008 Asian Women's Club Volleyball Championship was the 9th staging of the AVC Club Championships. The tournament was held in Vinh Yen Gymnasium, Vĩnh Yên, Vĩnh Phúc Province, Vietnam.

== Pools composition ==
The teams are seeded based on their final ranking at the 2007 Asian Women's Club Volleyball Championship.

Pool A	Pool B
Vietnam (Host); North Korea (3rd); Japan; Iran	Kazakhstan (1st); Thailand (2nd); China; Indonesia

== Preliminary round ==
=== Pool A ===
Pos	Team	Pld	W	L	Pts	SW	SL	SR	SPW	SPL	SPR	Qualification
1	(North Korea) Sobaeksu	3	3	0	6	9	4	2.250	289	245	1.180	Quarterfinals
2	(Japan) Toray Arrows	3	2	1	5	8	3	2.667	254	176	1.443	Quarterfinals
3	(Vietnam) Sport Center 1	3	1	2	4	5	6	0.833	227	219	1.037	Quarterfinals
4	(Iran) Zob Ahan Isfahan	3	0	3	3	0	9	0.000	95	225	0.422	Quarterfinals

Date		Score		Set 1	Set 2	Set 3	Set 4	Set 5	Total
01 Jun	Sobaeksu (North Korea)	3–2	(Japan) Toray Arrows	25–22	13–25	25–21	24–26	15–10	102–104
01 Jun	Sport Center 1 (Vietnam)	3–0	(Iran) Zob Ahan Isfahan	25–6	25–17	25–9			75–32
02 Jun	Zob Ahan Isfahan (Iran)	0–3	(Japan) Toray Arrows	8–25	9–25	3–25			20–75
02 Jun	Sport Center 1 (Vietnam)	2–3	(North Korea) Sobaeksu	16–25	20–25	25–23	26–24	11–15	98–112
03 Jun	Sobaeksu (North Korea)	3–0	(Iran) Zob Ahan Isfahan	25–12	25–14	25–17			75–43
03 Jun	Toray Arrows (Japan)	3–0	(Vietnam) Sport Center 1	25–20	25–19	25–15			75–54

=== Pool B ===
Pos	Team	Pld	W	L	Pts	SW	SL	SR	SPW	SPL	SPR	Qualification
1	(Thailand) Sang Som	3	3	0	6	9	1	9.000	240	176	1.364	Quarterfinals
2	(China) Tianjin Bridgestone	3	2	1	5	7	3	2.333	234	194	1.206	Quarterfinals
3	(Kazakhstan) Zhetyssu Almaty	3	1	2	4	3	6	0.500	173	208	0.832	Quarterfinals
4	(Indonesia) Bank Jatim Simpeda	3	0	3	3	0	9	0.000	156	225	0.693	Quarterfinals

Date		Score		Set 1	Set 2	Set 3	Set 4	Set 5	Total
01 Jun	Bank Jatim Simpeda (Indonesia)	0–3	(Thailand) Sang Som	14–25	19–25	11–25			44–75
01 Jun	Tianjin Bridgestone (China)	3–0	(Kazakhstan) Zhetyssu Almaty	25–18	25–13	25–19			75–50
02 Jun	Sang Som (Thailand)	3–0	(Kazakhstan) Zhetyssu Almaty	25–14	25–21	25–13			75–48
02 Jun	Bank Jatim Simpeda (Indonesia)	0–3	(China) Tianjin Bridgestone	22–25	19–25	13–25			54–75
03 Jun	Tianjin Bridgestone (China)	1–3	(Thailand) Sang Som	21–25	25–15	15–25	23–25		84–90
03 Jun	Zhetyssu Almaty (Kazakhstan)	3–0	(Indonesia) Bank Jatim Simpeda	25–18	25–20	25–20			75–58

== Final round ==
=== Championship ===
Quarterfinals
5 June – Vĩnh Yên
(North Korea) Sobaeksu	3
(Indonesia) Bank Jatim	0
5 June – Vĩnh Yên
(China) Tianjin	3
(Vietnam) Sport Center 1	0
5 June – Vĩnh Yên
(Thailand) Sang Som	3
(Iran) Zob Ahan	0
5 June – Vĩnh Yên
(Japan) Toray	3
(Kazakhstan) Zhetyssu	0

Semifinals
6 June – Vĩnh Yên
(North Korea) Sobaeksu	0
(China) Tianjin	3
6 June – Vĩnh Yên
(Thailand) Sang Som	3
(Japan) Toray	0

Final
7 June – Vĩnh Yên
(China) Tianjin	3
(Thailand) Sang Som	2
3rd place
7 June – Vĩnh Yên
(North Korea) Sobaeksu	2
(Japan) Toray	3

5th–8th places
6 June – Vĩnh Yên
(Indonesia) Bank Jatim	0
(Vietnam) Sport Center 1	3
6 June – Vĩnh Yên
(Iran) Zob Ahan	0
(Kazakhstan) Zhetyssu	3

5th place
7 June – Vĩnh Yên
(Vietnam) Sport Center 1	1
(Kazakhstan) Zhetyssu	3
7th place
7 June – Vĩnh Yên
(Indonesia) Bank Jatim	3
(Iran) Zob Ahan	1

=== Quarterfinals ===
Date		Score		Set 1	Set 2	Set 3	Set 4	Set 5	Total
05 Jun	Sobaeksu (North Korea)	3–0	(Indonesia) Bank Jatim Simpeda	25–15	25–23	25–19			75–57
05 Jun	Tianjin Bridgestone (China)	3–0	(Vietnam) Sport Center 1	25–12	25–22	25–18			75–52
05 Jun	Sang Som (Thailand)	3–0	(Iran) Zob Ahan Isfahan	25–11	25–8	25–9			75–28
05 Jun	Toray Arrows (Japan)	3–0	(Kazakhstan) Zhetyssu Almaty	25–18	25–22	25–17			75–57

=== 5th–8th semifinals ===
Date		Score		Set 1	Set 2	Set 3	Set 4	Set 5	Total
06 Jun	Bank Jatim Simpeda (Indonesia)	0–3	(Vietnam) Sport Center 1	20–25	12–25	19–25			51–75
06 Jun	Zob Ahan Isfahan (Iran)	0–3	(Kazakhstan) Zhetyssu Almaty	12–25	9–25	15–25			36–75

=== Semifinals ===
Date		Score		Set 1	Set 2	Set 3	Set 4	Set 5	Total
06 Jun	Sobaeksu (North Korea)	0–3	(China) Tianjin Bridgestone	20–25	14–25	13–25			47–75
06 Jun	Sang Som (Thailand)	3–0	(Japan) Toray Arrows	25–15	25–19	25–15			75–49

=== 7th place ===
Date		Score		Set 1	Set 2	Set 3	Set 4	Set 5	Total
07 Jun	Bank Jatim Simpeda (Indonesia)	3–1	(Iran) Zob Ahan Isfahan	25–18	20–25	25–21	25–22		95–86

=== 5th place ===
Date		Score		Set 1	Set 2	Set 3	Set 4	Set 5	Total
07 Jun	Sport Center 1 (Vietnam)	1–3	(Kazakhstan) Zhetyssu Almaty	21–25	25–18	15–25	16–25		77–93

=== 3rd place ===
Date		Score		Set 1	Set 2	Set 3	Set 4	Set 5	Total
07 Jun	Sobaeksu (North Korea)	2–3	(Japan) Toray Arrows	28–26	25–21	21–25	15–25	9–15	98–112

=== Final ===
Date		Score		Set 1	Set 2	Set 3	Set 4	Set 5	Total
07 Jun	Tianjin Bridgestone (China)	3–2	(Thailand) Sang Som	25–14	24–26	22–25	25–22	15–9	111–96

== Final standing ==
Rank	Team
1st place, gold medalist(s)	(China) Tianjin Bridgestone
2nd place, silver medalist(s)	(Thailand) Sang Som
3rd place, bronze medalist(s)	(Japan) Toray Arrows
4	(North Korea) Sobaeksu
5	(Kazakhstan) Zhetyssu Almaty
6	(Vietnam) Sport Center 1
7	(Indonesia) Bank Jatim Simpeda
8	(Iran) Zob Ahan Isfahan

== Awards ==
- MVP: (China) Li Shan (Tianjin)
- Best scorer: (Japan) Saori Sakoda (Toray)
- Best server: (China) Yu Jing (Tianjin)
- Best spiker: (China) Huo Jing (Tianjin)
- Best blocker: (Kazakhstan) Alessys Safronova (Zhetyssu)
- Best libero: (Japan) Kanari Hamaguchi (Toray)
- Best setter: (Thailand) Nootsara Tomkom (Sang Som)
- Miss Volleyball: (Vietnam) Phạm Thị Yến (Sport Center 1)
