= Kanako Naito =

Japanese volleyball player (1980–2019)

Personal information
- Nationality: Japanese
- Born: 4 November 1980
- Died: 13 October 2019 (aged 38)
- Hometown: Kōfu, Yamanashi
- Height: 1.82 m (6 ft 0 in)
- Weight: 68 kg (150 lb)

Volleyball information
- Position: middle blocker

National team
2002	Japan

Kanako Naito (内藤 香菜子, Naitō Kanako; 4 November 1980 – 13 October 2019) was a Japanese female volleyball player, who played as a middle blocker.

She was part of the Japan women's national volleyball team at the 2002 FIVB Volleyball Women's World Championship in Germany. On club level she played with Takefuji Bamboo and later for NEC Red Rockets.

== Clubs ==
- Takefuji Bamboo (2002)
- NEC Red Rockets (-2012)
