= Tatsukawa =

Tatsukawa (written: 達川 or 立川) is a Japanese surname. Notable people with the surname include:

- Arata Tatsukawa (立川 新, born 1997), Japanese judoka
- Minoru Tatsukawa (達川 実, born 1952), Japanese volleyball player and coach
- Mitsuo Tatsukawa (達川 光男, born 1955), Japanese baseball player
