= Ayano Nakaoji =

Japanese volleyball player (born 1991)

Personal information
- Nationality: Japanese
- Born: 24 July 1991 (age 35)
- Height: 1.67 m (5 ft 6 in)
- Weight: 64 kg (141 lb)
- Spike: 289 cm (114 in)
- Block: 279 cm (110 in)

Volleyball information
- Number: 15

Career
Years	Teams
2015	Hisamitsu Springs

Ayano Nakaoji (中大路 絢野, Nakaōji Ayano; born 24 July 1991) is a Japanese female volleyball player.

With her club Hisamitsu Springs she competed at the 2015 FIVB Volleyball Women's Club World Championship.
