= Saga Hisamitsu Springs =

Japanese volleyball club

- Short name: Hisamitsu Springs
- Ground: Kobe, Hyogo and Tosu, Saga; Japan.
- Manager Head coach: (Japan) Akira Kayashima (Japan) Kumi Nakada
- Captain: (Japan) Erika Sakae
- League: SV.League
- 2025/26: Champions
- Website: Club home page

Saga Hisamitsu Springs (SAGA久光スプリングス) is a women's volleyball team based in Kobe city, Hyogo and Tosu city, Saga, Japan. It plays in SV.League. The club was founded in 1948.

In July 2020 the team announced an official name change from "Hisamitsu Pharmaceutical Springs" to "Hisamitsu Springs" and unveiled a new team mascot and logo. On August 7, 2020 Hisamitsu Springs concluded " a cooperation agreement with Tosu City to further revitalize the region and economy through the volleyball business, and we will proceed with concrete efforts".

Hisamitsu Springs won the V.Premier League final for the seventh time on April 13, 2018, beating Toray Arrows.

The owner of the team is Hisamitsu Pharmaceutical.

== Home arena ==
On May 10, 2023, the Salonpas Arena was opened to the public in Tosu, Saga. With a maximum of 1400 seats, the new arena is the home arena of Hisamitsu Springs.

== Honours ==
Japan Volleyball League/V.League/V.Premiere League
Champions (8): 2001–2002, 2006–2007, 2012–2013, 2013–2014, 2015–2016, 2017–2018, 2018–2019, 2021-2022
Runners-up (6): 2000–2001, 2005–2006, 2008–2009, 2011–2012, 2014–2015, 2016-2017
Kurowashiki All Japan Volleyball Championship
Champions (3): 2006, 2007 and 2013
Runner-up (1): 2009
Empress's Cup
Champions (8): 2009, 2012, 2013, 2014, 2015, 2016, 2018, 2021
Runners-up (1): 2007-08
Domestic Sports Festival (Volleyball)
Champions (5): 1980, 1983, 1986, 1989 and 2012
Runners-up (3): 2011, 2014 and 2016
AVC Club Volleyball Championship
Champions (2): 2002 and 2014
Runners-up (2): 2015 and 2017

== League results ==
League		Position	Teams	Matches	Win	Lose
Japan League	15th (1981–82)	6th	8	21	6	15
Japan League	16th (1982–83)	8th	8	21	0	21
Japan League	18th (1984–85)	8th	8	21	3	18
Japan League	21st (1987–88)	8th	8	14	2	12
Japan League	25th (1991–92)	6th	8	14	4	10
Japan League	26th (1992–93)	8th	8	14	1	13
V・League	1st (1994–95)	8th	8	21	0	21
V・League	7th (2000–01)	Runner-up	10	18	12	6
V・League	8th (2001–02)	Champion	9	16	11	5
V・League	9th (2002–03)	4th	8	21	14	7
V・League	10th (2003–04)	3rd	10	18	12	6
V・League	11th (2004–05)	6th	10	27	14	13
V・League	12th (2005–06)	Runner-up	10	27	21	6
V・Premier	2006-07	Champion	10	27	20	7
V・Premier	2007-08	3rd	10	27	18	9
V・Premier	2008-09	Runner-up	10	27	19	8
V・Premier	2009-10	4th	8	28	20	8
V・Premier	2010-11	3rd	8	26	16	10
V・Premier	2011-12	Runner-up	8	21	15	6
V・Premier	2012-13	Champion	8	28	21	7
V・Premier	2013-14	Champion	8	28	23	5
V・Premier	2014-15	Runner-up	8	27	22	5
V・Premier	2015-16	Champion	8	21	15	6
V・Premier	2016-17	Runner-up	8	21	14	7
V・Premier	2017-18	Champion	8	21	21	0
V.League Division 1 (V1)	2018–19	Champion	11	20	18	2
V.League Division 1 (V1)	2019–20	7th	12	21	10	11
V.League Division 1 (V1)	2020–21	8th	12	21	10	11
V.League Division 1 (V1)	2021-22	Champion	12	33	21	10
SV.League	2024-25	3rd	14	44	30	14
SV.League	2025-26	Champion	14	44	36	8

== Current squad ==
2026/27 squad as of November 2026

- Head coach: (Japan) Kumi Nakada

No.	Name	Position	Date of birth	Height (m)
2	(Japan) Ayaka Araki	Middle Blocker	2 September 2001 (age 25)	1.85 m (6 ft 1 in)
3	(Japan) Ayane Kitamado	Outside Hitter	6 July 2004 (age 22)	1.83 m (6 ft 0 in)
4	(Latvia) Marta Levinska	Opposite Hitter	6 September 2001 (age 25)	1.88 m (6 ft 2 in)
5	(Japan) Sae Nakajima	Outside Hitter	18 June 1999 (age 27)	1.74 m (5 ft 9 in)
6	(Japan) Megumi Fukazawa	Outside Hitter	17 April 2003 (age 23)	1.76 m (5 ft 9 in)
7	(Japan) Minami Nishimura	Libero	23 March 2000 (age 26)	1.68 m (5 ft 6 in)
8	(Japan) Shion Hirayama	Middle Blocker	7 November 2000 (age 26)	1.80 m (5 ft 11 in)
9	(Japan) Manami Mandai	Setter	17 May 1998 (age 28)	1.68 m (5 ft 6 in)
10	(Japan) Aki Momii	Setter	7 October 2000 (age 26)	1.76 m (5 ft 9 in)
11	(Japan) Erika Sakae (C)	Setter	3 April 1991 (age 35)	1.68 m (5 ft 6 in)
13	(Japan) Mika Yoshitake	Outside Hitter	20 April 2003 (age 23)	1.82 m (6 ft 0 in)
14	(Japan) Meika Ogino	Outside Hitter	31 July 2007 (age 19)	1.79 m (5 ft 10 in)
15	(Japan) Kokoro Semba	Libero	10 March 2005 (age 21)	1.60 m (5 ft 3 in)
18	(Russia) Anastasia Stalnaya	Outside Hitter	6 January 1998 (age 28)	1.92 m (6 ft 4 in)
19	(Japan) Miina Inoue	Middle Blocker	22 January 2006 (age 20)	1.81 m (5 ft 11 in)
20	(Japan) Aoi Takahashi	Libero	26 December 2005 (age 20)	1.71 m (5 ft 7 in)
21	(Japan) Haruka Yamashita	Middle Blocker	4 June 2003 (age 23)	1.74 m (5 ft 9 in)

== Former players ==
Domestic players

Japan

- Shizuka Hyodo (2007–2009)
- Maiko Hanzawa (2007–2009)
- Ai Yamamoto (2008–2009)
- Aya Mikami (2006–2009)
- Eri Tokugawa (2006–2009)
- Naoko Hashimoto (2003–2009)
- Miki Ishii (2008–2010)
- Shuka Oyama (2001–2010)
- Miyuki Kano (2006–2010)
- Kanako Omura (2000–2010)
- Yuko Sano (2006–2010)
- Mizuho Ishida (2009–2015)
- Kanako Hirai (2007–2014)
- Maiko Kano (2012–2015)
- Risa Ishibashi (2012–2017
- Chizuru Koto (2009–2019)
- Akane Ukishima (2015–2018) Transferred to Kurobe AquaFairies
- Fumika Moriya (2014–2019) Transferred to Denso Airybees
- Sayaka Tsutsui (2016–2019) Transferred to PFU BlueCats
- Risa Shinnabe (2009–2020)
- Nana Iwasaka (2009–2021)
- Kotoki Zayasu (2008–2016, 2017–2021)
- Ayano Nakaoji Kojima (2013–2017, 2019–2021)
- Yuki Ishii (2010-2023)

Foreign players

Brazil

- Ana Paula Lopes Ferreira (2006–2007, 2011–2012)
- Elisângela Oliveira (2009–2011)
- Cibele Barboza (2013–2014)
- Fabiana Claudino (2019–2020)

Croatia

- Nataša Osmokrović (1996–1997)

Cuba

- Kenia Carcaces (2005–2006)

Greece

- Olga Strantzali (2025-2026)

Kazakhstan

- Yelena Pavlova (2007–2008)

Netherlands

- Francien Huurman (2002–2003)

Serbia

- Brankica Mihajlović (2014–2015)

Thailand

- Chitaporn Kamlangmak (2023-2024)
- Hattaya Bamrungsuk (2025-)

United States

- Logan Tom (2008–2009)
- Foluke Akinradewo (2017–2019)
- McKenzie Adams (2023-2024)
- Stephanie Samedy (2024-2026)
