= Saori Sakoda =

Japanese volleyball player (born 1987)

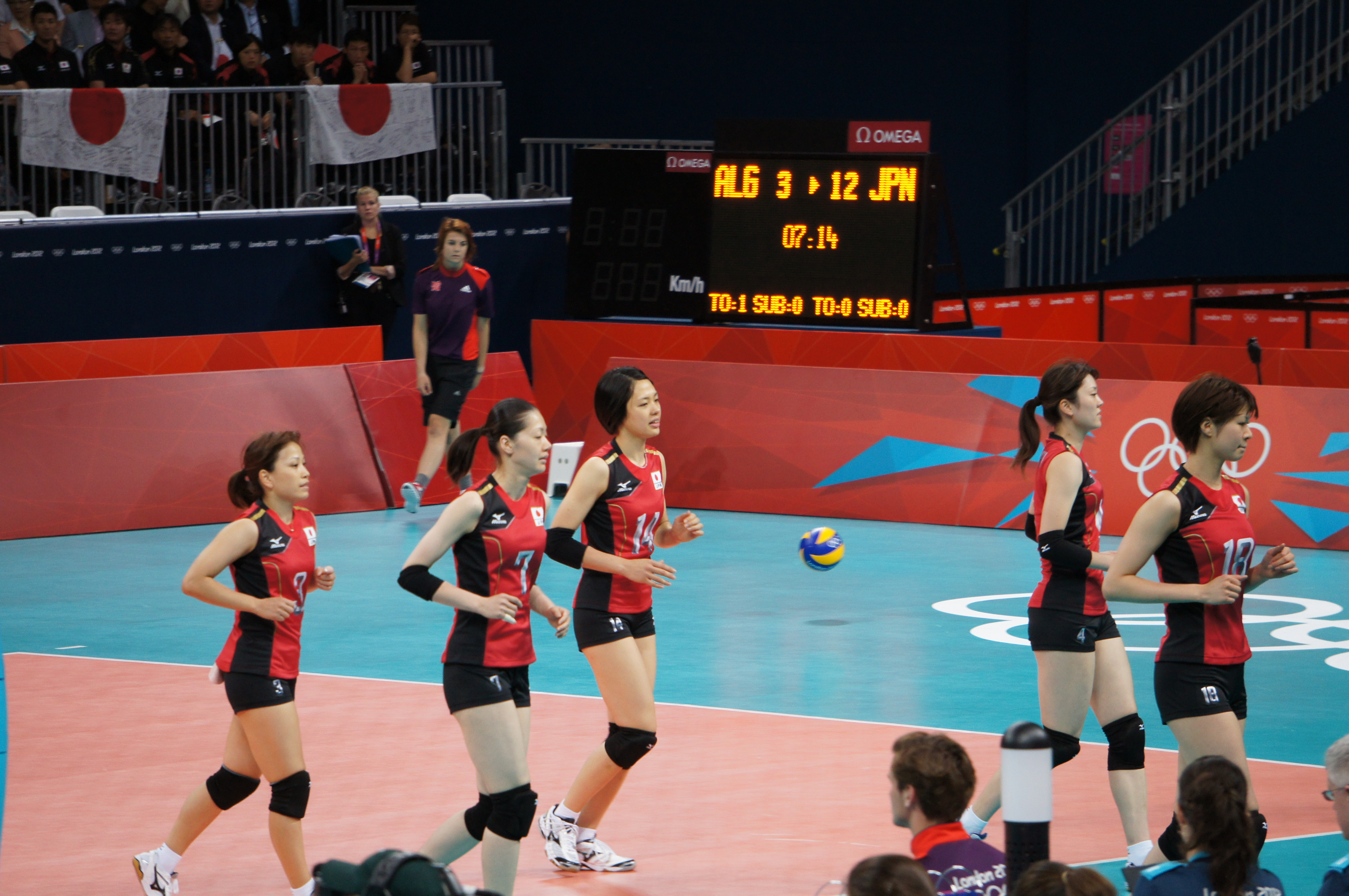

Personal information
- Full name: Saori Sakoda
- Born: December 18, 1987 (age 38) Kagoshima, Kagoshima, Japan
- Height: 175 cm (5 ft 9 in)
- Weight: 64 kg (141 lb)
- Spike: 305 cm (120 in)
- Block: 295 cm (116 in)

Volleyball information
- Position: Wing spiker / opposite spiker
- Current club: retired

National team
- Years: Team
- 2010-2016: Japan
Medal record
Women's volleyball
Representing Japan
Olympic Games
Bronze medal – third place	2012 London	Team
World Championship
Bronze medal – third place	2010 Japan	Team
Asian Championship
Silver medal – second place	2011 Taipei

Saori Sakoda (迫田さおり Sakoda Saori, born December 18, 1987) is a Japanese volleyball player who played for Toray Arrows. She also played for the All-Japan women's volleyball team.

== Clubs ==
- (Japan) Kagoshima-nishi High School
- (Japan) Toray Arrows (2006–17)

=== Individual ===
- 2008 Asian Club Championship "Best scorer"
- 2010 V.League (Japan): Best 6, Best Server
- 2010 Kurowashiki Tournament Best6
- 2013 FIVB Women's World Grand Champions Cup - Best Outside Hitter
- 2013-14 V.Premier League - Best6, Best Scorer

=== Team ===
- 2007 Domestic Sports Festival (Volleyball) - Champion, with Toray Arrows
- 2007-2008 Empress's Cup - Champion, with Toray Arrows
- 2007-2008 V.Premier League - Champion, with Toray Arrows
- 2008 Domestic Sports Festival - Runner-Up, with Toray Arrows
- 2008 Asian Club Championship - Bronze Medal with Toray Arrows
- 2008-2009 V.Premier League - Champion, with Toray Arrows
- 2009 Kurowashiki All Japan Volleyball Championship - Champion, with Toray Arrows
- 2009-2010 V.Premier League - Champion, with Toray Arrows
- 2010 Kurowashiki All Japan Volleyball Championship - Champion, with Toray Arrows
- 2010-2011 Empress's Cup - Runner-Up, with Toray Arrows
- 2010-2011 V.Premier League - Runner-up, with Toray Arrows
- 2011-2012 Empress's Cup - Champion, with Toray Arrows
- 2011-2012 V.Premier League - Champion, with Toray Arrows

=== National team ===
- 2010 World Championship - Bronze medal
- 2011 Montreux Volley Masters - Champion
- 2011 Asian Championship - Silver medal
- 2012 Olympics - Bronze medal
- 2013 World Grand Champion Cup - Bronze medal
- 2016 Olympics - 5th place (tied)
