= Kanari Hamaguchi =

Japanese volleyball player

Personal information
- Full name: Kanari Hamaguchi
- Nickname: Ri
- Born: August 29, 1985 (age 41); Isahaya, Nagasaki, Japan
- Height: 1.67 m (5 ft 6 in)
- Weight: 59 kg (130 lb)
- Spike: 280 cm (110 in)
- Block: 269 cm (106 in)

Volleyball information
- Position: Libero
- Current club: Toray Arrows
- Number: 3

National team
Japan 2009-
Medal record
Women's volleyball
Representing Japan
World Championship
Bronze medal – third place	2010 Japan	National team

Kanari Hamaguchi (濱口 華菜里, Hamaguchi Kanari; born August 29, 1985) is a Japanese volleyball player who plays for Toray Arrows.

== Clubs ==
- (Japan) Kyushubunka high school
- (Japan) Toray Arrows (2004–2013)

== Awards ==
=== Individual ===
- 2007-2008 V.Premier League - Best Receiver
- 2008 Asian Club Championship "Best Libero"
- 2009-2010 V.Premier League - Best Libero

=== Team ===
- 2007 Domestic Sports Festival (Volleyball) - Champion, with Toray Arrows
- 2007-2008 Empress's Cup - Champion, with Toray Arrows
- 2007-2008 V.Premier League - Champion, with Toray Arrows
- 2008 Domestic Sports Festival - Runner-Up, with Toray Arrows
- 2008 Asian Club Championship - Bronze Medal with Toray Arrows
- 2008-2009 V.Premier League - Champion, with Toray Arrows
- 2009 Kurowashiki All Japan Volleyball Championship - Champion, with Toray Arrows
- 2009-2010 V.Premier League - Champion, with Toray Arrows
- 2010 Kurowashiki All Japan Volleyball Championship - Champion, with Toray Arrows
- 2010-11 V.Premier League - Runner-up, with Toray Arrows

=== National team ===
- 2010 World Championship - Bronze medal
- 2011 Montreux Volley Masters - Champion
