= Janneke van Tienen =

Dutch volleyball player (born 1979)

Personal information
- Born: 29 May 1979 (age 47)
Medal record
Women's volleyball
Representing the Netherlands
European Championship
Silver medal – second place	2009 Poland	Team competition
FIVB World Grand Prix
Gold medal – first place	2007 Ningbo	Team competition

Janneke van Tienen (born 29 May 1979 in Mill) is a volleyball player from the Netherlands, who plays as a libero. She was a member of the Dutch National Women's Team that won the gold medal at the FIVB World Grand Prix 2007 in Ningbo, PR China.

== Awards ==
=== Individuals ===
- 2011 Montreux Volley Masters "Best Libero"
- 2011 Montreux Volley Masters "Best Receiver"
