= Saki Minemura =

Japanese volleyball player

Personal information
- Full name: Saki Minemura
- Nickname: Saki
- Born: April 18, 1990 (age 36); Nagano city, Nagano, Japan
- Height: 1.77 m (5 ft 10 in)
- Weight: 67 kg (148 lb)
- Spike: 294 cm (116 in)

Volleyball information
- Position: Wing spiker
- Current club: NEC Red Rockets
- Number: 17

National team
Japan

Saki Minemura (峯村沙紀 Minemura Saki, born April 18, 1990) is a Japanese volleyball player who plays for NEC Red Rockets.

== Early life ==
Minemura’s father was a teacher of physical education. She started playing volleyball at the age of 7.

While Minemura was attending Susobana junior high, the volleyball team won the Japanese junior high competition.

While she attended Kyushubunka Gakuen high school, the volleyball team won the Japanese high school competition. She played on the team with Honami Tsukiji and Yukari Miyata.

== Professional career ==
Minemura started her professional volleyball career in 2009 and she has played for the following teams.

- (Japan) Toray Arrows (2009–2017)
- (Japan) NEC Red Rockets (2018–2020)

== Awards ==
=== Team ===
- 2008 The 14th Asian Junior Volleyball Championship - Champion, with Junior national team
- 2009 Kurowashiki All Japan Volleyball Championship - Champion, with Toray Arrows
- 2009-2010 V.Premier League - Champion, with Toray Arrows
- 2010 Kurowashiki All Japan Volleyball Championship - Champion, with Toray Arrows
- 2010-11 V.Premier League - Runner-up, with Toray Arrows

=== National team ===
==== Junior team ====
- (Japan) Junior national team (2008–2009)
