= Kotoki Zayasu =

Japanese volleyball player (born 1990)

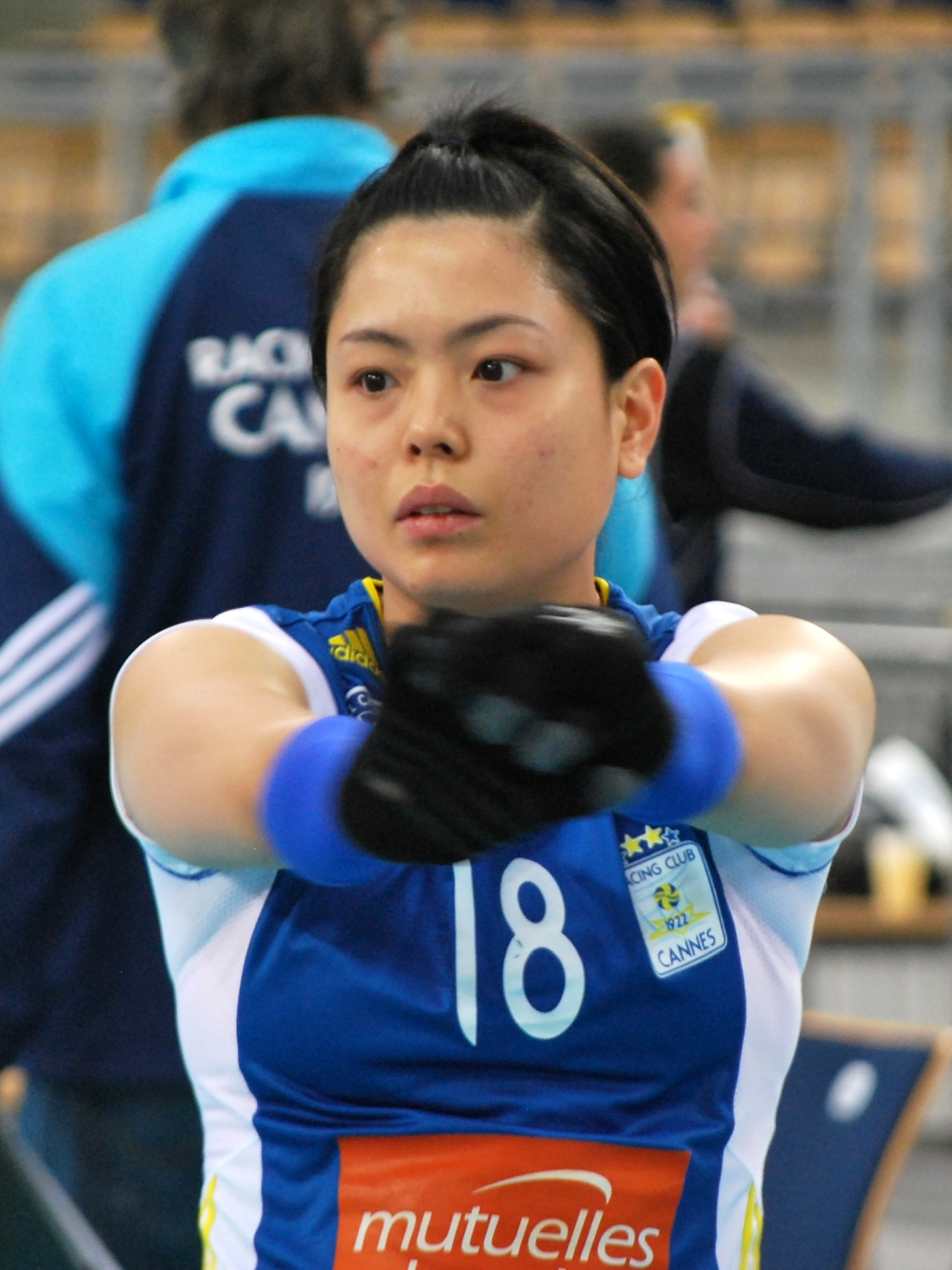

Personal information
- Full name: Kotoki Zayasu
- Nickname: Koto
- Born: January 11, 1990 (age 36); Ginowan, Okinawa, Japan
- Height: 1.60 m (5 ft 3 in)
- Weight: 56 kg (123 lb)
- Spike: 280 cm (110 in)
- Block: 269 cm (106 in)

Volleyball information
- Position: Libero
- Current club: (Japan) Hisamitsu Springs

National team
Japan

Kotoki Zayasu (座安 琴希, Zayasu Kotoki; born January 11, 1990) is a Japanese volleyball player who plays for RC Cannes. She played for the Japan national team during the 2016 Summer Olympics.

== Career ==
Kotoki became a volleyball player at 9 years old. While in high school Kotoki served as captain of the team, and played as setter.

On 1 April 2008 Kotoki joined Hisamitsu Springs.

In March 2011 Kotoki was selected a member of national team, for which she played in the Montreux Volley Masters and the FIVB Volleyball Women's World Cup.

== Clubs ==
- (Japan) Okinawa Prefectural Chubu Commercial High School.
- (Japan) Hisamitsu Springs (2008–2016)
- (France) RC Cannes (2016–2017)
- (Japan) Hisamitsu Springs (2017-

== Awards ==
=== Individual ===
- 2011-2012 V.Premier League - Best Receiver, Best Libero.
- 2015 Montreux Volley Masters - Best Libero

=== Team ===
- 2011–12 V.Premier League - Runner-up, with Hisamitsu Springs.
- 2014 - Empress's Cup - Champion, with Hisamitsu Springs.
- 2014-2015 V.Premier League - Runner-Up, with Hisamitsu Springs.

=== National team ===
- 2015 Montreux Volley Masters - Silver medal

== National team ==
- (Japan) National team (2011-)
