= Kaori Kodaira =

Japanese volleyball player (born 1990)

Personal information
- Full name: Kaori Kodaira
- Nickname: Kao
- Born: April 13, 1990 (age 36); Chino, Nagano
- Height: 1.70 m (5 ft 7 in)
- Weight: 62 kg (137 lb)
- Spike: 297 cm (117 in)
- Block: cm

Volleyball information
- Position: Wing spiker / libero
- Current club: Toray Arrows
- Number: 5

Kaori Kodaira (小平花織 Kodaira Kaori, born April 13, 1990) is a Japanese volleyball player who plays for Toray Arrows.

== Clubs ==
- (Japan) Tokai University Daisan Senior High School
- (Japan) Toray Arrows (2009–)
