= Yukiko Ebata =

Japanese former volleyball player

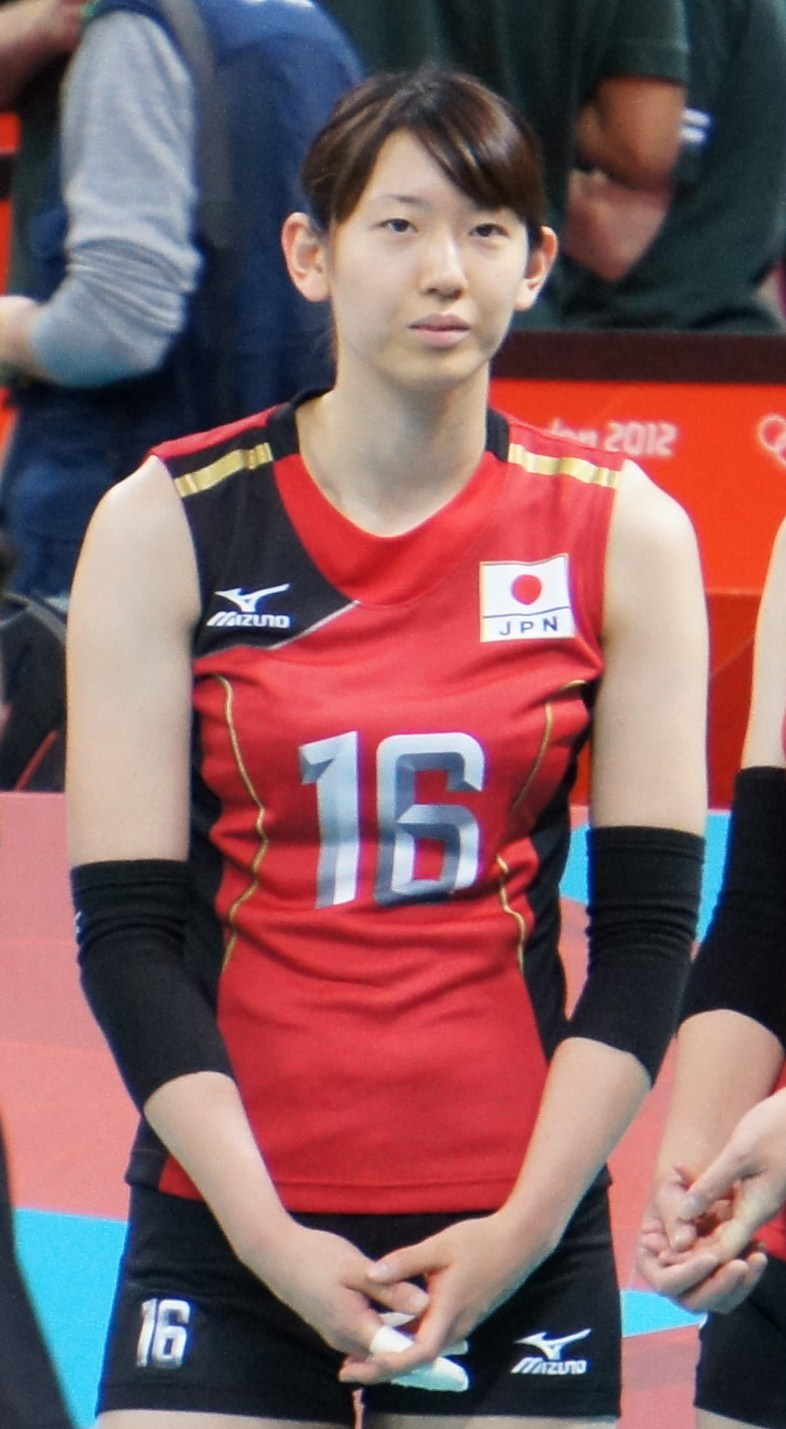

Personal information
- Full name: Yukiko Ebata
- Nickname: Eba
- Born: November 7, 1989 (age 36) Akita, Akita, Japan
- Height: 176 cm (5 ft 9 in)
- Weight: 68 kg (150 lb)
- Spike: 305 cm (120 in)
- Block: 298 cm (117 in)

Volleyball information
- Position: Wing Spiker
- Current club: Retired

National team
- Years: Team
- 2010–2016: Japan
Medal record
Women's volleyball
Representing Japan
Olympic Games
Bronze medal – third place	2012 London	Team
World Championship
Bronze medal – third place	2010 Japan	Team
Asian Championship
Silver medal – second place	2011 Taipei

Yukiko Ebata (江畑 幸子 Ebata Yukiko, born November 7, 1989) is a retired Japanese volleyball player who played for the PFU BlueCats and was a member of the Japan women's national volleyball team. She was a member of Japan's bronze medal-winning 2012 Olympic volleyball team.

== Biography ==
Ebata is from Tsuchizaki-Minato, Akita-shi, Akita prefecture. Her parents are volleyball players, she started playing volleyball when she is in her 3rd year in elementary school. She also has an older brother who also played volleyball.

When she entered college, she was offered a scholarship by the director of the Holy Spiritual Women's Junior College, in return for playing volleyball for the school. Ebata has said that this was a major turning point for her. She was then attached to the Holy Spiritual Women's Junior College, she was active in the Spring High Valley and Inter – high as captain.

=== Personal life ===
In August 2022, she married Shun Takahashi who is the coach of the women's volleyball team Victorina Himeji.

== Career ==
In 2008, she was recruited by the Hitachi Rivale professional women's volleyball club team as one of their active wing spikers in 2009–10. In 2010, she was registered as one of the representatives of Japan women's national volleyball team at the 2010 World Grand Prix making her the youngest player in the team. In addition, during the World Championship in October–November of the same year, she scored 24 points for Japan in their second match of the qualifying round against Turkey on November 7, which is also her birthday. The team went on to win the bronze medal, her performance made a big contribution for the team.

In June 2011, at the 2011 Montreux Volley Masters, she contributed greatly to her first win with the team against Turkey, due to her great performance, she won the Best Spiker award in the said tournament. Meanwhile, in the 2011 FIVB Volleyball Women's World Cup, she contributed to Japan's victory as an ace and at her young age, she leads Japan to a 4th-place finish.

In March 2012, she contributed to the victory of Hitachi Rivale in the V. Challenge League, eventually winning the MVP award. In the same year, she participated in the 2012 London Olympic games alongside the Japanese women's volleyball team. She showed great success in her hitting throughout the games and particularly in the quarter-finals against China where she scored her all-time highest with 33 points. Ebata helped earn the team a place in the semi-finals after a 5 set win over China. Japan eventually lost the semi-finals against Brazil, however, went on to take the bronze medal match sweeping all 3 sets over South Korea. The Japanese women's volleyball team had earned their first Olympic medal in 28 years since the Los Angeles 1984 bronze medal win.

In February 2013, she was appointed as the brand ambassadress of the local regional bank of Akita.

On July 24, 2014, Hitachi Rivale announced the transfer of Ebata to RC Cannes women's professional volleyball club team. The transfer date happened on September 1, 2014.

On June 1, 2015, PFU BlueCats of the V Challenge League announced the joining of Ebata on the club. She is currently playing on the team.

She announced her retirement after Season 2020/21.

== Playing style ==
As a wing spiker, she mainly plays on the opposite side. She is known for her powerful spike, she is good at processing blocks out and distributing the ball properly. Her signature move is her backrow attack.

She said that before attacking a ball, you must first better to decide of such a place in the court of the opposing team where the scene of the reception collapsed for you to have a more successful attack.

Yukiko also said that she doesn't like participating in the practice of her team during the service reception and defense so she is often exempt.

== Clubs ==
- (Japan) Seirei High School
- (Japan) Hitachi Rivale (2008–2014)
- (France) RC Cannes (2014)
- (Japan) PFU BlueCats (2015–2021)

== National team ==
- (Japan) National team (2010–2016)
  - 2010 FIVB Volleyball Women's World Championship – Bronze Medal
  - Volleyball at the 2012 Summer Olympics – Bronze Medal
  - 2014 FIVB Volleyball Women's World Championship – 7th place

== Awards ==
=== Individuals ===
- 2011 Montreux Volley Masters – Best spiker
- 2012 バレーボール2011/12Vプレミアリーグ – Most Valuable Player (MVP)

=== Team ===
- 2010 2009–10 V.Challenge League – Champion, with Hitachi Rivale.
- 2011 2010–11 V.Challenge League – Runner-up, with Hitachi Rivale.
- 2015 2015–16 V.Challenge League l – Runner-up, with PFU Bluecats.
- 2016 2016–17 V.Challenge League l – Runner-up, with PFU Bluecats.

=== National team ===
- 2010 World Championship – Bronze medal
- 2011 Montreux Volley Masters – Champion
- 2011 Asian Championship – Silver medal
- 2012 Olympics – Bronze medal
- 2013 Asian Championship – Silver medal
- 2013 Women's World Grand Champions Cup – Bronze medal
- 2014 FIVB World Grand Prix – Silver medal
- 2015 Montreux Volley Masters – Runner-Up
