= Miya Sato =

Japanese volleyball player

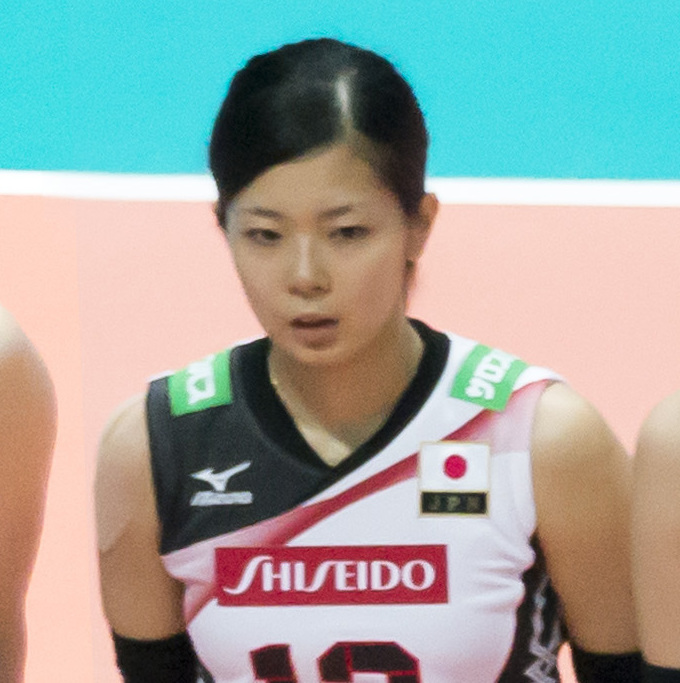
- Miya Sato, Japan Volleyball team

Personal information
- Full name: Miya Sato
- Nickname: Miya
- Born: October 23, 1986 (age 40); Shinagawa, Tokyo, Japan
- Height: 1.76 m (5 ft 9 in)
- Weight: 75 kg (165 lb)
- Spike: 293 cm (115 in)
- Block: 287 cm (113 in)

Volleyball information
- Position: Wing spiker

Miya Sato (佐藤 美耶, Satō Miya; born October 23, 1986) is a Japanese volleyball player who played for Toray Arrows. She announced her retirement on 27 May 2010. She participated in the 2010 Asian Women's Volleyball Cup.

== Profiles ==
- When attending high school, Saori Kimura was a classmate. She later became a teammate at Toray Arrows.

== Clubs ==
- (Japan) ShimokitazawaSeitoku high school
- (Japan) Toray Arrows (2005–2010)

== Awards ==
=== Team ===
- 2007 Domestic Sports Festival (Volleyball) - Champion, with Toray Arrows
- 2007-2008 Empress's Cup - Champion, with Toray Arrows
- 2007-2008 V.Premier League - Champion, with Toray Arrows
- 2008 Domestic Sports Festival - Runner-Up, with Toray Arrows
- 2008-2009 V.Premier League - Champion, with Toray Arrows
- 2009 Kurowashiki All Japan Volleyball Championship - Champion, with Toray Arrows
- 2009-2010 V.Premier League - Champion, with Toray Arrows
- 2010 Kurowashiki All Japan Volleyball Championship - Champion, with Toray Arrows
