= Aya Mikami =

Japanese volleyball player

Personal information
- Full name: Aya Mikami
- Nickname: Luka
- Born: January 27, 1984 (age 42); Kōriyama, Fukushima, Japan
- Height: 1.75 m (5 ft 9 in)
- Weight: 64 kg (141 lb)
- Spike: 291 cm (115 in)

Volleyball information
- Position: Setter
- Current club: Hisamitsu Springs
- Number: 13

National team
Japan

Aya Mikami (三上彩 Mikami Aya, born January 27, 1984) is a Japanese volleyball player who plays for Hisamitsu Springs.

== Clubs ==
- FurukawaShogyo High School → Tsukuba Univ. → Hisamitsu Springs (2006-)

== National team ==
- Japan Universiade national team (2005)

== Honours ==
- Team
  - Japan Volleyball League/V.League/V.Premier
    Champions (1): 2006-07
  - Kurowashiki All Japan Volleyball Championship
    Champions (2): 2006, 2007
  - Empress' Cup
    Runners-up (1): 2007
