= Aki Shibata =

Japanese volleyball player

Personal information
- Full name: Aki Shibata
- Nickname: Tact
- Born: January 6, 1981 (age 45); Gobō, Wakayama, Japan
- Height: 1.75 m (5 ft 9 in)
- Weight: 66 kg (146 lb)
- Spike: 298 cm (117 in)
- Block: 288 cm (113 in)

Volleyball information
- Position: Opposite

Aki Shibata (芝田安希 Shibata Aki, born January 6, 1981) was a Japanese volleyball player who played for Toray Arrows. She served as captain of the team between 2008 and 2010. Toray announced that she retired in June 2010.

== Clubs ==
- (Japan) Kyoto Seian high school
- (Japan) Unitika Fenics (1999–2000)
- (Japan) Toray Arrows (2001–2010)

== Awards ==
=== team ===
- 2002 Kurowashiki All Japan Volleyball Championship - Champion, with Toray Arrows
- 2004 Kurowashiki All Japan Volleyball Championship - Champion, with Toray Arrows
- 2007 Domestic Sports Festival (Volleyball) - Champion, with Toray Arrows
- 2007-2008 Empress's Cup - Champion, with Toray Arrows
- 2007-2008 V.Premier League - Champion, with Toray Arrows
- 2008 Domestic Sports Festival - Runner-Up, with Toray Arrows
- 2008-2009 V.Premier League - Champion, with Toray Arrows
- 2009 Kurowashiki All Japan Volleyball Championship - Champion, with Toray Arrows
- 2009-2010 V.Premier League - Champion, with Toray Arrows
- 2010 Kurowashiki All Japan Volleyball Championship - Champion, with Toray Arrows
