= Takefuji Bamboo =

Japanese volleyball club

Club Name	武富士バンブー
Arena	Sugito, Saitama, Japan
Manager	(Japan) Yukio Nagata
Head coach	(Japan) Akihisa Ishihara
League	V.Premier League
Position 2008-09	V.Premier League; 8th place
Team Colors	Green
Website	gogo-bamboo.tv
1st	2nd

Takefuji Bamboo (武富士バンブー, Takefuji Banbū) was a women's volleyball team based in Sugito, Saitama, Japan that was active between 2001 and 2009. It played in V.Premier League.

== Branding ==
The team logo is based on Kaguya-hime, principal character in Japanese mythology The Tale of the Bamboo Cutter. The owner of the team is Takefuji.

== History ==
The team was formed in 2001 and played in the V.Priemier League volleyball league.

On 13 February 2009, Takefuji announced that it would stop the activities of Takefuji Bamboo in May 2009.

== Honours ==
Japan Volleyball League/V.League/V.Premier League

- Runners-up (1): 2002-2003

== League results ==
League		Position	Teams	Matches	Win	Lose
V.League	8th (2001–02)	7th	9	16	4	12
V.League	9th (2002–03)	Runner-up	8	21	12	9
V.League	10th (2003–04)	8th	10	18	6	12
V.League	11th (2004–05)	7th	10	27	13	14
V.League	12th (2005–06)	3rd	10	27	16	11
V・Premier	2006-07	4th	10	27	19	8
V・Premier	2007-08	9th	10	27	8	19
V・Premier	2008-09	8th	10	27	13	14

== Squad ==
- 1 (Japan) Chie Yoshizawa
- 2 (Japan) Misato Kaneko
- 3 (Japan) Ayako Sawahata
- 4 (Japan) Keiko Hara
- 5 (Japan) Rumi Adachi
- 6 (Japan) Ayaka Ikeura
- 7 (Japan) Kanako Naitoh (Captain)
- 8 (Japan) Yuki Ishikawa
- 10 (Japan) Naomi Imamura
- 11 (Japan) Masae Hirai
- 12 (Japan) Ayuka Hattori
- 13 (Japan) Tomomi Tamukai
- 14 (Japan) Yuka Misawa
- 18 (Japan) Haruka Sunada
- 22 (Japan) Mizuho Ishida
- 23 (Japan) Ayano Yamanaka
