= Ai Inden =

Japanese volleyball player (born 1987)

Personal information
- Full name: Ai Inden
- Nickname: Ai
- Born: 3 April 1987 (age 39); Yokkaichi, Mie, Japan
- Height: 1.73 m (5 ft 8 in)
- Weight: 63 kg (139 lb)
- Spike: 292 cm (115 in)
- Block: 275 cm (108 in)

Volleyball information
- Position: Wing Spiker
- Current club: JT Marvelous
- Number: 5

National team
Japan (2008)

Ai Inden (位田 愛 Inden Ai, born 3 April 1987) is a Japanese volleyball player who plays for JT Marvelous.

== Profile ==
- She became a volleyball player at 12 years old.
- She served as captain of the team between 2009 and 2010.

== Clubs ==
- (Japan) Mie Prefectural Tsushogyo High School
- (Japan) JT Marvelous (2006–)

== Awards ==
=== Team ===
- 2006–2007 V.Premier League – Runner-Up, with JT Marvelous.
- 2007 56th Kurowashiki All Japan Volleyball Championship – Runner-Up, with JT Marvelous.
- 2009–2010 V.Premier League – Runner-Up, with JT Marvelous.
- 2010 59th Kurowashiki All Japan Volleyball Tournament – Runner-Up, with JT Marvelous.
- 2010–11 V.Premier League – Champion, with JT Marvelous.
- 2011 60th Kurowashiki All Japan Volleyball Tournament – Champion, with JT Marvelous.

=== National team ===
- Japan 2008 – 1st AVC Women's Cup
