= Yukari Miyata =

Japanese volleyball player

Personal information
- Full name: Yukari Miyata
- Nickname: Yukari
- Born: June 27, 1989 (age 37) Isahaya, Nagasaki, Japan
- Height: 1.79 m (5 ft 10 in)
- Weight: 63 kg (139 lb)
- Spike: 307 cm (121 in)

Volleyball information
- Position: Middle blocker
- Current club: Toray Arrows
- Number: 11

Yukari Miyata (宮田由佳里 Miyata Yukari, born June 27, 1989) is a Japanese volleyball player who plays for Toray Arrows.

== Profiles ==
- While attending Kyushubunka Gakuen high school, the volleyball team won the top of Japanese high school with Honami Tsukiji and Saki Minemura.

== Clubs ==
- (Japan) Kyushubunka high school
- (Japan) Toray Arrows (2008–)

== Awards ==
=== Individual ===
- 2008-2009 V.Premier League - New face award

=== Team ===
- 2008 Domestic Sports Festival (Volleyball) - Runner-Up, with Toray Arrows
- 2008-2009 V.Premier League - Champion, with Toray Arrows
- 2009 Kurowashiki All Japan Volleyball Championship - Champion, with Toray Arrows
- 2009-2010 V.Premier League - Champion, with Toray Arrows
- 2010 Kurowashiki All Japan Volleyball Championship - Champion, with Toray Arrows
- 2010-11 V.Premier League - Runner-up, with Toray Arrows
