= Mariko Mori (volleyball) =

Japanese volleyball player

Personal information
- Full name: Mariko Mori
- Nickname: May
- Born: June 17, 1981 (age 45); Osaka, Japan
- Height: 1.82 m (6 ft 0 in)
- Weight: 71 kg (157 lb)
- Spike: 304 cm (120 in)
- Block: 282 cm (111 in)

Volleyball information
- Position: Middle blocker
- Current club: Toray Arrows
- Number: 1

National team
Japan 2008

Mariko Mori (森 万里子 Mori Mariko, born June 17, 1981) is a Japanese volleyball player who plays for Toray Arrows. She served as sub captain of the team between 2008 and 2010. Her maiden name was Mariko Nishiwaki.

== Clubs ==
- (Japan) Osaka Shitennouji high school
- (Japan) Toyobo Orkis (2000–2002)
- (Japan) Toray Arrows (2002–2012)

== Awards ==
=== Individuals ===
- 2006–07 V.Premier League – Spike awards
- 2008–09 V.Premier League – Spike awards, Best6

=== Team ===
- 2004 Kurowashiki All Japan Volleyball Championship – Champion, with Toray Arrows
- 2007 Domestic Sports Festival (Volleyball) – Champion, with Toray Arrows
- 2007–2008 Empress's Cup – Champion, with Toray Arrows
- 2007–2008 V.Premier League – Champion, with Toray Arrows
- 2008 Domestic Sports Festival – Runner-Up, with Toray Arrows
- 2008–2009 V.Premier League – Champion, with Toray Arrows
- 2009 Kurowashiki All Japan Volleyball Championship – Champion, with Toray Arrows
- 2009–2010 V.Premier League – Champion, with Toray Arrows
- 2010 Kurowashiki All Japan Volleyball Championship – Champion, with Toray Arrows
- 2010–11 V.Premier League – Runner-Up, with Toray Arrows

=== National team ===
- 2008 World Grand Prix 2008
