= Honami Tsukiji =

Japanese volleyball player (born 1989)

Personal information
- Full name: Honami Tsukiji
- Nickname: Nami
- Born: April 27, 1989 (age 37); Fukuoka, Fukuoka, Japan
- Height: 1.76 m (5 ft 9 in)
- Weight: 63 kg (139 lb)
- Spike: 298 cm (117 in)

Volleyball information
- Position: Middle Blocker
- Current club: Toray Arrows

Honami Tsukiji (築地 保奈美 Tsukiji Honami, born April 27, 1989) is a Japanese volleyball player who played for Toray Arrows.

== Profiles ==
- While attending Kyushubunka Gakuen high school, the volleyball team won the top of Japanese high school with Yukari Miyata and Saki Minemura.
- In June 2011, she retired and became the team staff.

== Clubs ==
- (Japan) Kyushubunka high school
- (Japan) Toray Arrows (2008-2011)

== Awards ==
=== Team ===
- 2008 Domestic Sports Festival (Volleyball) - Runner-Up, with Toray Arrows.
- 2008-2009 V.Premier League - Champion, with Toray Arrows.
- 2009 Kurowashiki All Japan Volleyball Championship - Champion, with Toray Arrows.
- 2009-2010 V.Premier League - Champion, with Toray Arrows.
- 2010 Kurowashiki All Japan Volleyball Championship - Champion, with Toray Arrows.
- 2010-11 V.Premier League - Runner-up, with Toray Arrows.
