= Ayaka Araki =

Japanese volleyball player (born 2001)

Personal information
- Full name: Ayaka Araki
- Nationality: Japanese
- Born: 2 September 2001 (age 25) Onojo City, Fukuoka, Japan
- Height: 1.85 m (6 ft 1 in)
- Weight: 78 kg (172 lb)
- Spike: 300 cm (118 in)
- Block: 292 cm (115 in)

Volleyball information
- Position: Middle blocker
- Current club: (Japan) Saga Hisamitsu Springs
- Number: 2

Career
- Years: Team
- 2017–2020 2020–present: (Japan) Higashi Kyushu Ryukoku High School (Japan) Saga Hisamitsu Springs

National team
- Years: Team
- 2017–: Japan
Honours
Women's volleyball
Representing Japan
Nations League
Silver medal – second place	2024 Bangkok	Team
Asian U18 Championship
Gold medal – first place	2017 Chongqing	team
U20 World Championship
Gold medal – first place	2019 Mexico	team

Ayaka Araki (荒木 彩花, Araki Ayaka; born 2 September 2001) is a Japanese professional volleyball player. She plays in the SV.League for Saga Hisamitsu Springs.

== Personal life ==
She wears goggles while playing because she was hit in the eye by Foluke Akinradewo while jumping to block during training session. During interview with Erika Araki, she said, "... when I put the ball out with an incomplete hand, it hit my right eye directly, leaving me blind for about a week. I was told that if I was hit again, I would go blind, so I started wearing goggles."

== Career ==
=== Early Years ===
Araki started playing volleyball in junior high school. By her second year, she was selected for the JOC (National Inter-Prefectural Junior High School Volleyball Tournament) and also named a promising Olympic athlete. In her third year, she was selected as the best player and attended Higashi Kyushu Ryukoku High School, a strong volleyball school. It was the former team of Miyu Nagaoka whom she admired.

In January 2020, the team won the 72nd All Japan High School Volleyball Championship (Haruko). She was named as the best 6. In the same year, she won the U20 World Championship, alongside Mayu Ishikawa, Nichika Yamada and Minami Nishimura.

=== Professional Years ===
On January 24, 2020, she was accepted to join Hisamitsu Pharmaceutical (now Saga Hisamitsu Springs). As she debuted into professional league, she injured her right knee and underwent a surgery.

Although she didn't play much games in the 2021-22 V.League Division 1 Women season, she was outstanding in the 2022-23 V.League Division 1 Women's season. She won the Spike Award, Block Award, and named as the best 6.

Araki was selected for Japan women's national volleyball team in 2023. She also selected as a member to compete in Volleyball Nations League. She was a starting member in 8 of 12 qualifying matches.

However, on July 1, her brilliant debut must stop there. Midway through the second set of the match against Thailand, she stepped on an opponent foot while landing a block, she injured her right ankle and was substituted. She left the venue with a wheelchair because she unable to stand by herself.

The injury occurred at her prime time when she made strong impression in the Nations League. She had to withdraw from the team and missed the chance to play in the OQT. She stated that this was the most painful injury and mentally draining she has ever had.

On November 26, 2023, she stepped on the court for the first time in about five month towards the end of the second set against JT Marvelous (now Osaka Marvelous).

On January 6, 2024, she made her first starting member in the match against NEC Red Rockets. Unfortunately, she injured her left ring finger. She was benched in the match against Denso Airybees the next following day. On January 11, the team announced that she underwent surgery for a fractured metacarpal bone in her left ring finger.

== Awards ==
=== Individual ===
- 2019-2020 All Japan High School Championship - Best Middle Blocker
- 2022-23 V.League Division 1 Women's - Spike Awards, Block Awards, Best 6

=== High School Team ===
- 2017-18 All Japan High School Championship - - Runner-up, with Higashi Kyushu Ryukoku
- 2018-19 All Japan High School Championship - - Runner-up, with Higashi Kyushu Ryukoku
- 2019-20 All Japan High School Championship - - Champion, with Higashi Kyushu Ryukoku

=== Club Team ===
- 2021–22 V.League Division 1 Women's - - Champion, with Hisamitsu Springs
- 2021-22 Empress' Cup All Japan Championship - - Champion, with Hisamitsu Springs
- 2022-23 Empress' Cup All Japan Championship - - Bronze Medal, with Hisamitsu Springs
- 2022–23 V.League Division 1 Women's - - Bronze Medal, with Hisamitsu Springs
- 2023-24 Kurowashiki Tournament - - Bronze Medal, with Hisamitsu Springs
- 2023-24 Empress' Cup All Japan Championship - - Runner-up, with Hisamitsu Springs
- 2024-25 Empress' Cup All Japan Championship - - Runner-up, with Saga Hisamitsu Springs
- 2024-25 SV.League Women's - - Bronze Medal, with Saga Hisamitsu Springs

=== National Team ===
- (China) 2017 Asian Girls' U18 Volleyball Championship - - Champion
- (Mexico) 2019 FIVB Volleyball Women's U20 World Championship - - Champion
- (Thailand) 2024 FIVB Women's Volleyball Nations League - - Runner-up
