= 2015 Montreux Volley Masters =

Women's volleyball tournament

Tournament details
- Host country: Switzerland
- Dates: May 26 – 31
- Teams: 8
- Venue: 1 (in 1 host city)

Final positions
- Champions: Turkey (1st title)

Tournament awards
- MVP: Yuki Ishii (JPN)

The 2015 Montreux Volley Masters is a women's volleyball competition set in Montreux, Switzerland between May 26 – 31, 2015. Turkey won the tournament for the first time by winning 3–2 to Japan in the championship match. Japanese Yuki Ishii was selected Most Valuable Player.

== Participating teams ==
Pool A	Pool B
China; Dominican Republic; Netherlands; Russia	Germany (Defending champion); Italy; Japan; Turkey

== Group stage ==
=== Group A ===
Pos	Team	Pld	W	L	Pts	SW	SL	SR	SPW	SPL	SPR	Qualification
1	Netherlands	3	3	0	9	9	1	9.000	254	213	1.192	Semifinals
2	Russia	3	2	1	6	7	4	1.750	252	255	0.988	Semifinals
3	China	3	1	2	3	4	7	0.571	254	258	0.984	
4	Dominican Republic	3	0	3	0	1	9	0.111	212	246	0.862	

Date	Time		Score		Set 1	Set 2	Set 3	Set 4	Set 5	Total	Report
26 May	16:30	China	3–1	Dominican Republic	25–20	20–25	25–20	25–20		95–85	Report
27 May	16:30	China	0–3	Netherlands	18–25	24–26	27–29			69–80	Report
27 May	21:00	Dominican Republic	0–3	Russia	23–25	21–25	23–25			67–75	Report
28 May	18:30	Netherlands	3–1	Russia	25–20	23–25	25–17	25–22		98–84	Report
29 May	16:30	Dominican Republic	0–3	Netherlands	14-25	24-26	22-25			60–0	Report
29 May	21:00	Russia	3–1	China	18–25	25–23	25–19	25–23		93–90	Report

=== Group B ===
Pos	Team	Pld	W	L	Pts	SW	SL	SR	SPW	SPL	SPR	Qualification
1	Japan	3	3	0	9	9	1	9.000	255	203	1.256	Semifinals
2	Turkey	3	2	1	6	6	4	1.500	231	218	1.060	Semifinals
3	Germany	3	1	2	3	5	7	0.714	261	276	0.946	
4	Italy	3	0	3	0	1	9	0.111	202	252	0.802	

Date	Time		Score		Set 1	Set 2	Set 3	Set 4	Set 5	Total	Report
26 May	19:10	Italy	1–3	Germany	20–25	15–25	25–21	23–25		83–96	Report
26 May	21:40	Japan	3–0	Turkey	25–19	26–24	25–18			76–61	Report
27 May	18:30	Turkey	3–1	Germany	17–25	25–22	25–16	25–14		92–77	Report
28 May	16:30	Germany	1–3	Japan	27–25	17–25	20–25	24–26		88–101	Report
28 May	21:00	Italy	0–3	Turkey	17–25	26–28	22–25			65–78	Report
29 May	18:30	Japan	3–0	Italy	25–12	28–26	25–16			78–54	Report

== Classification round ==
Date	Time		Score		Set 1	Set 2	Set 3	Set 4	Set 5	Total	Report
30 May	14:00	Germany	3–1	Dominican Republic	25–19	27–29	26–24	28–26		106–98	Report
30 May	21:00	China	1–3	Italy	25–27	21–25	25–15	16–25		87–92	Report

== Final round ==
Semifinals
30 May 2015 – Montreux
Netherlands	2
Turkey	3
30 May 2015 – Montreux
Japan	3
Russia	0

Final
31 May 2015 – Montreux
Turkey	3
Japan	2
3rd place
31 May 2015 – Montreux
Netherlands	3
Russia	0

=== Semifinals ===
Date	Time		Score		Set 1	Set 2	Set 3	Set 4	Set 5	Total	Report
30 May	16:30	Netherlands	2–3	Turkey	27–29	25–23	13–25	25–17	13–15	103–109	Report
30 May	19:00	Japan	3–0	Russia	25–23	25–22	25–13			75–58	Report

=== Third place match ===
Date	Time		Score		Set 1	Set 2	Set 3	Set 4	Set 5	Total	Report
31 May	13:30	Netherlands	3–0	Russia	25–21	25–21	25–21			75–63	Report

=== Final ===
Date	Time		Score		Set 1	Set 2	Set 3	Set 4	Set 5	Total	Report
31 May	16:00	Turkey	3–2	Japan	22–25	19–25	25–19	25–23	15–10	106–102	Report

== Final standings ==
Rank	Team
1st place, gold medalist(s)	Turkey
2nd place, silver medalist(s)	Japan
3rd place, bronze medalist(s)	Netherlands
4	Russia
5	Germany
5	Italy
7	China
7	Dominican Republic

== Awards ==
- Most valuable player
  (Japan) Yuki Ishii
- Best outside spikers
  (Japan) Yuki Ishii
  (Netherlands) Anne Buijs
- Best libero
  (Japan) Kotoki Zayasu
- Best middle blockers
  (Netherlands) Yvon Belien
  (Turkey) Büşra Cansu
- Best setter
  (Turkey) Naz Aydemir
- Best opposite spiker
  (Netherlands) Lonneke Slöetjes
