= Ayane Kitamado =

Japanese volleyball player (born 2004)

Personal information
- Nationality: Japanese
- Born: 6 July 2004 (age 22) Matsue City, Shimane, Japan
- Height: 1.82 m (6 ft 0 in)
- Weight: 62 kg (137 lb)
- Spike: 297 cm (117 in)
- Block: 285 cm (112 in)

Volleyball information
- Position: Outside Hitter / Middle Blocker
- Current club: (Japan) Saga Hisamitsu Springs
- Number: 30 (national); 3 (club)

Career
- Years: Team
- 2020–2023 2023–present: (Japan) Seiei High School (Japan) Saga Hisamitsu Springs

National team
- Years: Team
- 2022–: Japan
Honours
Women's volleyball
Representing Japan
AVC Continental Championship
Bronze medal – third place	2026 Tianjin	Team
Asian U20 Championship
Gold medal – first place	2022 Nur Sultan	Team

Ayane Kitamado (北窓 絢音, Kitamado Ayane; born 6 July 2004) is a Japanese professional volleyball player. She plays in the SV.League for Saga Hisamitsu Springs.

== Career ==
=== Early Years ===
In 2022, Kitamado was selected for Japan women's national under-21 volleyball team. She participated in the 2022 Asian Women's U20 Volleyball Championship where the team won the championship.

In her final high school year, the team finished as a runner-up in the 75th All Japan High School Championship (Haruko) (ja) after defeated by Furukawa Gakuen High School in a full-set match.

She has been offered to join Hisamitsu Springs for 2022-23 V.League Division 1 Women's. Coach Shingo Sakai highly praised both her offensive and defensive ability. He also noted that she could play not only as a middle blocker but also as an outside hitter or opposite, and she said that she want to determine which position she would suited the best.

=== Professional Years ===
She officially joined Hisamitsu Springs after graduating high school in 2023. She made her debut for the team in the 2023 Asian Women's Club Volleyball Championship in Vietnam, the team finished in the fifth place. In July the same year, she participated in the V.Summer League and won Fresh Star award. The team finished with a record 5 win 1 loss in six match. She was then called up to the Japan women's national under-21 volleyball team once again to participate in 2023 FIVB Volleyball Women's U21 World Championship in Mexico, the team finished in the fourth place.

She then made her debut for the V.League in 2023-24 V.League Division 1 Women's.

In 2025, she was selected for Japan women's national volleyball team for the first time.

== Award ==
=== Individual ===
- 2022 National High School Athletic Meet - Outstanding Player
- 2023 75th All Japan High School Championship - Outstanding Player
- 2023 V.Summer League - Fresh Star

=== High School Team ===
- 2022-23 All Japan High School Championship - - Runner-up, with Seiei High School

=== Club Team ===
- 2022-23 Empress' Cup All Japan Championship - - Bronze Medal, with Hisamitsu Springs
- 2022–23 V.League Division 1 Women's - - Bronze Medal, with Hisamitsu Springs
- 2023-24 Kurowashiki Tournament - - Bronze Medal, with Hisamitsu Springs
- 2023-24 Empress' Cup All Japan Championship - - Runner-up, with Hisamitsu Springs
- 2024-25 Empress' Cup All Japan Championship - - Runner-up, with Saga Hisamitsu Springs
- 2024-25 SV.League Women's - - Bronze Medal, with Saga Hisamitsu Springs
- 2025-26 SV.League Women's - - Champion, with Saga Hisamitsu Springs

=== National Team ===
- (Kazakhstan) 2022 Asian Women's U20 Volleyball Championship - - Champion
- (China) 2026 AVC Women's Volleyball Continental Championship - - Bronze Medal
