= Megumi Fukazawa =

Japanese volleyball player (born 2003)

Personal information
- Full name: Megumi Fukazawa
- Nationality: Japanese
- Born: 17 April 2003 (age 23) Yokohama City, Kanagawa, Japan
- Height: 1.76 m (5 ft 9 in)
- Weight: 65 kg (143 lb)
- Spike: 302 cm (119 in)
- Block: 288 cm (113 in)

Volleyball information
- Position: Outside hitter
- Current club: (Japan) Saga Hisamitsu Springs
- Number: 28 (national); 6 (club)

Career
- Years: Team
- 2019–2022 2022–present: (Japan) Shujitsu High School (Japan) Saga Hisamitsu Springs

National team
- Years: Team
- 2022, 2025: Japan
Honours
Women's volleyball
Representing Japan
Asian U20 Championship
Gold medal – first place	2022 Nur Sultan	Team

Megumi Fukazawa (深澤 めぐみ, Fukazawa Megumi; born 17 April 2003) is a Japanese professional volleyball player. She plays in the SV.League for Saga Hisamitsu Springs.

== Personal life ==
Megumi's twin sister, Tsugumi Fukazawa is also a volleyball player. Both sisters play in the SV.League. They both became interested in volleyball after watching the Japanese national team matches on television together, and started playing at the same time in the first grade of elementary school.

== Career ==
=== Early Years ===
In 2019, she enrolled in Shujitsu High School along with Tsugumi. In her second year, she won All Japan High School Championship (Haruko) and named as the MVP.

Then, in January 2022, she contributed to the team's consecutive victory in Haruko Volleyball and received the MVP award for the second year in a row.

=== Professional Years ===
Hisamitsu Springs announced that she would join the team as a prospective player for the 2021–22 season.

In July 2022, she was selected along with Tsugumi to represent Japan at 2022 Asian U20 Championship where the team won the championship.

She made her V1 debut on the match against Toyota Auto Body Queenseis and scored 24 points.

In 2025, she was selected for the Japan women's national volleyball team for the first time. She was also selected for the 2025 VNL where she often served as a pinch server.

== Award ==
=== Individual ===
- 2020-21 All Japan High School Championship - Best Scorer, MVP
- 2021-22 All Japan High School Championship - MVP

=== High School Team ===
- 2020-21 All Japan High School Championship - - Champion, with Shujitsu High School
- 2021-22 All Japan High School Championship - - Champion, with Shujitsu High School

=== Club Team ===
- 2021-22 Empress' Cup All Japan Volleyball Championship - - Champion, with Hisamitsu Springs
- 2021-22 V.League Division 1 Women's - - Champion, with Hisamitsu Springs
- 2022-23 Empress' Cup All Japan Volleyball Championship - - Bronze Medal, with Hisamitsu Springs
- 2022-23 V.League Division 1 Women's - - Bronze Medal, with Hisamitsu Springs
- 2023-24 Kurowashiki All Japan Volleyball Tournament - - Bronze Medal, with Hisamitsu Springs
- 2023-24 Empress' Cup All Japan Volleyball Championship - - Runner-up, with Hisamitsu Springs
- 2024-25 Empress' Cup All Japan Volleyball Championship - - Runner-up, with Saga Hisamitsu Springs
- 2024-25 SV.League Women's - - Bronze Medal, with Saga Hisamitsu Springs

=== National Team ===
- (Kazakhstan) 2022 Asian U20 Championship - - Champion
