= Nene Tomita =

Japanese volleyball player (born 1982)

Personal information
- Full name: Nene Tomita
- Born: September 30, 1982 (age 44); China
- Height: 1.83 m (6 ft 0 in)
- Weight: 75 kg (165 lb)

Volleyball information
- Position: Middle Blocker

Nene Tomita (Japanese: 冨田 寧寧; Tomita Nene; born September 30, 1982) is a Japanese former volleyball player who played for Toray Arrows.

== Profiles ==
Nene's parents were basketball players originally from China. Her father died when she was a baby, and her mother took her to Japan. Nene's mother remarried a Japanese national, so Nene's nationality is not Chinese but Japanese.

When Nene was in 6th grade, she appeared in a TV show featuring the tallest young girls in Japan. She was 177 cm. When asked how tall she would like to be, her reply was 185 cm. She retired from Toray Arrows in May 2008.

== Clubs ==
- (Japan) Furukawa Commercial High School
- (Japan) Hitachi Rivale (2001)
- (Japan) Toray Arrows (2001–2008)

== Awards ==
=== Individual ===
- 2001 8th V.League New face award

=== Team ===
- 2002 Kurowashiki All Japan Volleyball Championship - Champion, with Toray Arrows.
- 2004 Kurowashiki All Japan Volleyball Championship - Champion, with Toray Arrows.
- 2007 Domestic Sports Festival (Volleyball) - Champion, with Toray Arrows.
- 2007-2008 Empress's Cup - Champion, with Toray Arrows.
- 2007-2008 V.Premier League - Champion, with Toray Arrows.
