= Minoru Tatsukawa =

Japanese volleyball player (born 1952)

Minoru Tatsukawa (達川実, Tatsukawa Minoru, born August 16, 1952 in Osaka) is a volleyball coach from Japan. Currentry he serves as head coach of Denso Airybees.

== Career ==
- 1975 After graduating from Osaka University of Commerce, he became an assistant coach of Unitika.
- 1992 Assistant coach of Women's national volleyball team in the Barcelona Olympic games.
- 1995 He became a head coach of Unitika.
- 2000 Unitika Phoenix was abolished and it moved Toray Arrows.
- 2005 He retired a head coach and was appointed vice general manager of Toray Arrows.
- 2006 Denso Airybees had invited him as a head coach.

== Honours as a head coach ==
- V.League/V.Premier League
  - Champion (1) 1995
  - Runners-up (2) 2003, 2007–08
- Kurowashiki All Japan Volleyball Tournament
  - Champion (1) 2008
