= Nana Iwasaka =

Japanese volleyball player

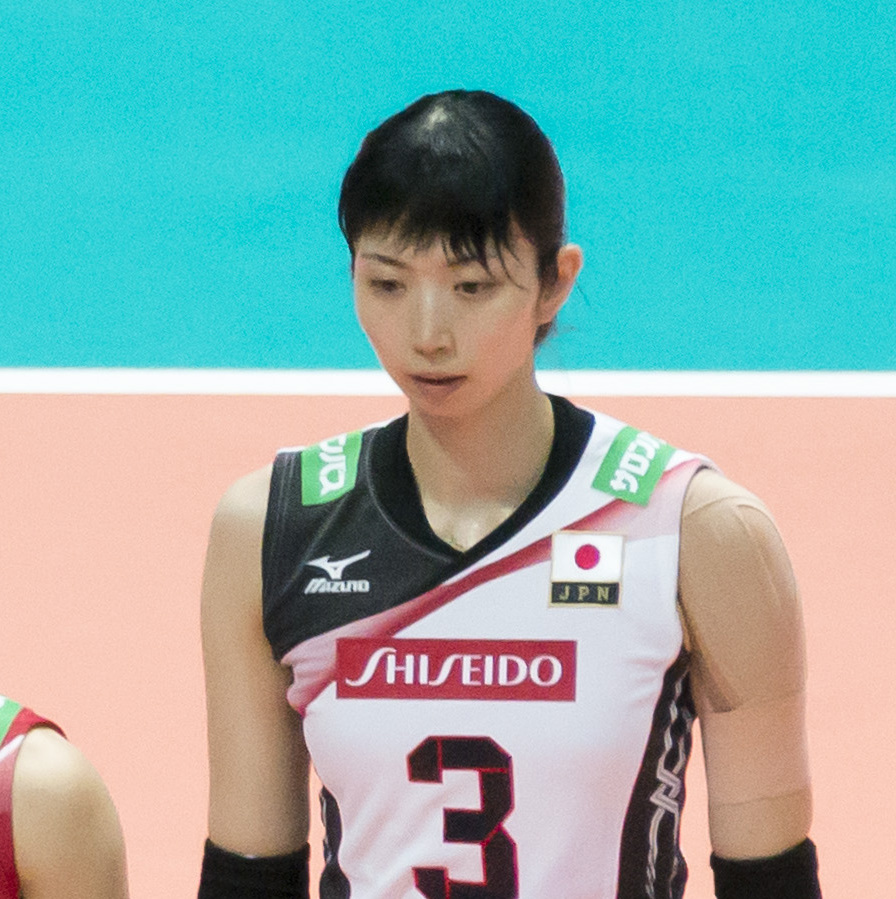

Personal information
- Full name: Nana Iwasaka
- Nickname: Nana
- Born: July 3, 1990 (age 36); Fukuoka City, Fukuoka, Japan
- Height: 1.87 m (6 ft 2 in)
- Weight: 76 kg (168 lb)
- Spike: 320 cm (130 in)
- Block: 310 cm (122 in)

Volleyball information
- Position: Middle Blocker
- Current club: Hisamitsu Springs
- Number: 4

National team
Japan
Honours
Women's volleyball
Representing Japan
Montreux Volley Masters
Gold medal – first place	2011 Montreux	Team
Asian Championship
Silver medal – second place	2013 Nakhon Ratchasima
Gold medal – first place	2017 Biñan

Nana Iwasaka (岩坂 名奈, Iwasaka Nana; born July 3, 1990) is a retired Japanese volleyball player who plays for Hisamitsu Springs.

== Life ==
She was born in 1990 in Fukuoka City. Iwasaka was part of the Japanese national team that won the 2011 Montreux Volley Masters in Switzerland.

Nana retired in 2021.

== Clubs ==
- (Japan) Fukuoka Municipal Takamiya Junior High
- (Japan) Higashikyushu Ryukoku High School
- (Japan) Hisamitsu Springs (2009-)

== National team ==
- (Japan) Youth national team (2007)
- (Japan) Junior national team (2008)
- (Japan) Senior national team (2009, 2011-2021)

== Awards ==
=== Individuals ===
- 2011 Montreux Volley Masters "Best Server"
- 2013-14 V.Premier League - Best6
- 2017 Asian Championship "Best Middle Blocker"

=== Clubs ===
- 2011-2012 V.Premier League - Runner-Up, with Hisamitsu Springs.
- 2012 Empress's Cup - Champion, with Hisamitsu Springs.
- 2012-2013 V.Premier League - Champion, with Hisamitsu Springs.
- 2013 - Korea-Japan V.League Top Match - Champion, with Hisamitsu Springs.
- 2013 - Kurowashiki All Japan Volleyball Tournament - Champion, with Hisamitsu Springs.
- 2013 - Empress's Cup - Champion, with Hisamitsu Springs.
- 2013-2014 V.Premier League - Champion, with Hisamitsu Springs.
- 2014 Asian Club Championship - Champion, with Hisamitsu Springs.

=== National team ===
- 2011 Montreux Volley Masters - Champion
- 2013 Asian Women's Volleyball Championship - Silver medal
- 2017 Asian Women's Volleyball Championship - Champion

==== Junior team ====
- 2008 14th Asian Junior Volleyball Championship - Champion
