= Yuki Ishikawa (volleyball) =

Japanese volleyball player (born 1987)

Personal information
- Full name: Yuki Ishikawa
- Born: 26 April 1987 (age 39); Ageo, Saitama, Japan
- Height: 1.82 m (6 ft 0 in)
- Weight: 65 kg (143 lb)
- Spike: 296 cm (117 in)
- Block: 286 cm (113 in)

Volleyball information
- Position: Center
- Current club: JT Marvelous
- Number: 9

National team
Japan

Yuki Ishikawa (石川 友紀, Ishikawa Yuki; born 26 April 1987) is a Japanese female volleyball player who plays for the Japan National Volleyball team.

== Clubs ==
- Kawagoe Municipal High School → Takefuji Bamboo (2006–2009) → JT Marvelous (2009-2014)

== National team ==
- Japan 2006, 2009, 2011

== Awards ==
=== Individuals ===
- 2006 Kurowashiki All Japan Volleyball Tournament: New Face award
- 2007 2006-07 V.Premier League: New Face award

=== Team ===
- 2009-2010 V.Premier League - Runner-Up, with JT Marvelous.
- 2010 59th Kurowashiki All Japan Volleyball Tournament - Runner-Up, with JT Marvelous.
- 2010-11 V.Premier League - Champion, with JT Marvelous.
- 2011 60th Kurowashiki All Japan Volleyball Tournament - Champion, with JT Marvelous.

=== National team ===
- 2006 6th place in the World Championship in Japan
