= Toray Arrows Shiga =

Japanese volleyball club

- Ground: Ōtsu, Shiga, Japan
- Manager Head coach: (Japan) Masaki Morioka (Japan) Akira Koshiya
- Captain: Tsugumi Fukazawa
- League: SV.League
- 2025-26: 13th
- Website: Club home page

Uniforms
Home	Away

Toray Arrows (東レアローズ滋賀) is a women's volleyball team based in Ōtsu, Shiga, Japan. It plays in SV.League. The club was founded in 2000. The owner of the team is Toray Industries. The jersey number of the team is the order of the age (excluding foreigners).

== Honours ==
V.League/V.Premier

- Champions (4): 2007-08, 2008–09, 2009–10 and 2011–12
- Runners-up (4): 2003-2004, 2010-11, 2012-13, 2018-2019, 2020–21

Kurowashiki All Japan Volleyball Championship

- Champions (4): 2002, 2004, 2009 and 2010
- Runners-up (2): 2012 and 2014

Empress's Cup

- Champions (2): 2007-08, 2011
- Runners-up (2): 2010, 2012

Domestic Sports Festival (Volleyball)

- Champions (2): 2007. 2011
- Runners-up (4): 2005, 2008, 2010, 2012

== League results ==
League		Position	Teams	Matches	Win	Lose
V.League	7th (2000–01)	4th	10	18	9	9
V.League	8th (2001–02)	4th	9	16	14	2
V.League	9th (2002–03)	3rd	8	21	12	9
V.League	10th (2003–04)	Runner-up	10	18	13	5
V.League	11th (2004–05)	8th	10	27	11	16
V.League	12th (2005–06)	4th	10	27	20	7
V・Premier	2006-07	6th	10	27	11	16
V・Premier	2007-08	Champions	10	27	23	4
V・Premier	2008-09	Champions	10	27	20	7
V・Premier	2009-10	Champions	8	28	21	7
V・Premier	2010-11	Runner-up	8	26	19	7
V・Premier	2011-12	Champions	8	21	18	3
V・Premier	2012-13	Runner-up	8	28	20	8
V・Premier	2013-14	3rd	8	28	18	10
V・Premier	2014-15	6th	8	21	10	11
V・Premier	2015-16	3rd	8	21	17	4
V・Premier	2016-17	6th	8	21	10	11
V・Premier	2017-18	6th	8	21	8	13
V.League Division 1 (V1)	2018-19	Runner-up	11	20	13	7
V.League Division 1 (V1)	2019-20	6th	12	21	14	7
V.League Division 1 (V1)	2020–21	Runner-up	12	21	21	0
SV.League	2024-25	7th	14	44	26	18
SV.League	2025-26	13th	14	44	6	38

== Players ==
=== Current squad ===
2026/27 Squad as of November 2026

- Head coach: (Japan) Hitomi Nakamichi

No.	Name	Position	Date of birth	Height (m)
1	(Japan) Mei Matsuoka	Libero	22 May 2001 (age 25)	1.65 m (5 ft 5 in)
2	(Ukraine) Diana Meliushkyna	Middle Blocker	6 August 1996 (age 30)	1.90 m (6 ft 3 in)
3	(Japan) Madoka Kashimura	Middle Blocker	6 November 2002 (age 24)	1.83 m (6 ft 0 in)
4	(Japan) Miku Nakashima	Libero	7 March 1998 (age 28)	1.69 m (5 ft 7 in)
5	(Japan) Chisato Hanaoka	Setter	13 June 2006 (age 20)	1.74 m (5 ft 9 in)
6	(Japan) Tsugumi Fukazawa	Outside Hitter	17 April 2003 (age 23)	1.76 m (5 ft 9 in)
7	(Japan) Erina Ogawa	Middle Blocker	3 June 1998 (age 28)	1.78 m (5 ft 10 in)
8	(Japan) Kaede Kawazoe	Setter	3 June 2001 (age 25)	1.66 m (5 ft 5 in)
9	(Japan) Kaya Watanabe	Outside Hitter	9 June 1998 (age 28)	1.71 m (5 ft 7 in)
10	(Japan) Risa Yajima	Outside Hitter	8 March 2005 (age 21)	1.72 m (5 ft 8 in)
11	(Italy) Josephine Obossa	Opposite Hitter	20 May 1999 (age 27)	1.83 m (6 ft 0 in)
12	(Japan) Rin Honda	Middle Blocker	9 July 2003 (age 23)	1.78 m (5 ft 10 in)
14	(Japan) Koyuki Oritate	Outside Hitter	29 December 2003 (age 22)	1.70 m (5 ft 7 in)
15	(Japan) Aika Hayashida	Middle Blocker	19 August 1999 (age 27)	1.77 m (5 ft 10 in)
16	(Japan) Minami Kessoku	Outside Hitter	16 January 2007 (age 19)	1.70 m (5 ft 7 in)
20	(Japan) Aoba Shiozaki	Middle Blocker	22 May 2000 (age 26)	1.77 m (5 ft 10 in)
22	(Poland) Weronika Szlagowska	Outside Hitter	29 November 2001 (age 24)	1.89 m (6 ft 2 in)

=== Former players ===
Domestic players

Japan

- Yuko Sano (2000-2004)
- Nene Tomita (2001-2008)
- Hisako Mukai (2000-2008)
- Erika Araki (2003-2008)
- Yuka Higashiyama (2005-2009)
- Kotomi Matsushita (2007-2009)
- Sayoko Komatsuzaki (2007-2009)
- Aki Shibata (2000-2010)
- Kana Oyama (2003-2010)
- Miki Oyama (2004-2010)
- Miya Sato (2005-2010)
- Honami Tsukiji (2008-2011)
- Mariko Mori (2002-2012)
- Saori Kimura (2005-2012, 2014–2017)
- Saori Sakoda (2006–2017)
- Erika Araki (2009-2013)
- Kanari Hamaguchi (2004-2013)
- Marie Wada (2006-2013)
- Yukari Miyata (2008-2014)
- Hitomi Nakamichi (2004–2015)
- Kaori Kodaira (2008–2015)
- Azusa Futami (2011–2015)
- Kanami Tashiro (2009-2018)
- Mari Horikawa (2011–2020)
- Moe Hidaka (2017–2020)
- Kaho Ōno (2010–2021)
- Nozomi Itoh (2012–2021)
- Misaki Shirai (2014-2022)
- Yuki Higane (2021-2022)

Foreign players

Azerbaijan

- Jana Kulan (2021-2022)

Belgium

- Liesbet Vindevoghel (2010-2011)

China

- Zhang Yuehong (2008-2009)

Dominican Republic

- Bethania de la Cruz (2007-2008)
- Yonkaira Peña (2013-2014)

France

- Lucille Gicquel (2025-2026)

Italy

- Sylvia Nwakalor (2023-2024)

Netherlands

- Manon Flier (2011-2012)
- Juliët Lohuis (2024-2026)

Philippines

- Dindin Santiago-Manabat (2018-2019)

Puerto Rico

- Stephanie Enright (2012-2013)

Serbia

- Jelena Nikolić (2005-2006)

Thailand

- Wimonrat Thanaphan (2023-2024)

United States

- Cynthia Barboza (2009-2010)

== Coaching staff ==
Head coach

- 2000 - 2005: (Japan) Minoru Tatsukawa
- Current: (Japan) Akira Koshiya
