= 2011 Montreux Volley Masters =

Women's volleyball tournament

Tournament details
- Host country: Switzerland
- Dates: June 7 – 12
- Teams: 8
- Venue: Pierrier Sports Hall (in Montreux host cities)

Final positions
- Champions: Japan (1st title)

Tournament awards
- MVP: (Japan) Hitomi Nakamichi

The 2011 Montreux Volley Masters was held in Montreux, Switzerland between 7–12 June 2011. Eight teams participated in this tournament.

== Participating teams ==
Group A	Group B
China; Germany; Peru; United States	Cuba; Italy; Japan; Netherlands

== Group stage ==
=== Group A ===
==== Table ====
Pos	Team	Pld	W	L	Pts	SW	SL	SR	SPW	SPL	SPR	Qualification
1	China	3	3	0	7	9	5	1.800	320	281	1.139	Semifinals
2	United States	3	2	1	6	8	6	1.333	300	278	1.079	Semifinals
3	Germany	3	1	2	5	7	6	1.167	291	266	1.094	
4	Peru	3	0	3	0	2	9	0.222	186	272	0.684	

==== Results ====
Date	Time		Score		Set 1	Set 2	Set 3	Set 4	Set 5	Total	Report
7 Jun	16:30	United States	3–1	Peru	25–7	24–26	25–11	25–19		99–63	Report
7 Jun	18:30	China	3–2	Germany	25–23	25–27	26–24	22–25	15–11	113–110	Report
8 Jun	21:00	Peru	0–3	Germany	20–25	10–25	20–25			50–75	Report
9 Jun	16:30	China	3–1	Peru	25–17	23–25	25–16	25–15		98–73	Report
9 Jun	18:30	Germany	2–3	United States	19–25	25–22	23–25	25–15	14–16	106–103	Report
10 Jun	21:00	United States	2–3	China	27–25	14–25	25–19	21–25	11–15	98–109	Report

=== Group B ===
==== Table ====
Pos	Team	Pld	W	L	Pts	SW	SL	SR	SPW	SPL	SPR	Qualification
1	Cuba	3	3	0	8	9	3	3.000	277	257	1.078	Semifinals
2	Japan	3	2	1	6	8	5	1.600	288	258	1.116	Semifinals
3	Netherlands	3	1	2	4	5	7	0.714	266	276	0.964	
4	Italy	3	0	3	0	2	9	0.222	237	277	0.856	

==== Results ====
Date	Time		Score		Set 1	Set 2	Set 3	Set 4	Set 5	Total	Report
7 Jun	21:00	Italy	1–3	Cuba	20–25	27–29	25–23	22–25		94–102	Report
8 Jun	16:30	Netherlands	0–3	Cuba	23–25	16–25	24–26			63–76	Report
8 Jun	18:30	Japan	3–0	Italy	25–17	25–19	25–20			75–56	Report
9 Jun	21:00	Japan	3–2	Netherlands	20–25	27–29	25–18	25–17	16–14	113–103	Report
10 Jun	16:30	Italy	1–3	Netherlands	25–23	24–26	14–25	24–26		87–100	Report
10 Jun	18:30	Cuba	3–2	Japan	15–25	19–25	25–20	25–20	15–10	99–100	Report

== Classification round ==
5–8th place
2011-06-11 – Montreux
Germany	3
Italy	1
2011-06-11 – Montreux
Netherlands	3
Peru	1

5th place
2011-06-12 – Montreux
Germany	1
Netherlands	3

=== 5th–8th place ===
Date	Time		Score		Set 1	Set 2	Set 3	Set 4	Set 5	Total	Report
11 Jun	14:00	Germany	3–1	Italy	25–8	25–20	25–27	25–17		100–72	Report
11 Jun	16:00	Netherlands	3–1	Peru	25–23	26–24	24–26	25–20		100–93	Report

=== 5th place match ===
Date	Time		Score		Set 1	Set 2	Set 3	Set 4	Set 5	Total	Report
12 Jun	11:00	Germany	1–3	Netherlands	20–25	25–15	18–25	26–28		89–93	Report

== Final round ==
Semi finals
2011-06-11 – Montreux
China	0
Japan	3
2011-06-11 – Montreux
Cuba	3
United States	1

Final
2011-06-12 – Montreux
Japan	3
Cuba	0
3rd place
2011-06-12 – Montreux
China	3
United States	1

=== Semifinals ===
Date	Time		Score		Set 1	Set 2	Set 3	Set 4	Set 5	Total	Report
11 Jun	18:30	China	0–3	Japan	22–25	19–25	23–25			64–75	Report
11 Jun	21:00	Cuba	3–1	United States	25–18	25–22	17–25	26–24		93–89	Report

=== 3rd place match ===
Date	Time		Score		Set 1	Set 2	Set 3	Set 4	Set 5	Total	Report
12 Jun	13:30	China	3–1	United States	16–25	25–13	29–27	25–23		95–88	Report

=== Final ===
Date	Time		Score		Set 1	Set 2	Set 3	Set 4	Set 5	Total	Report
12 Jun	16:00	Japan	3–0	Cuba	26–24	25–18	25–19			76–61	Report

== Final standings ==
Rank	Team
1st place, gold medalist(s)	Japan
2nd place, silver medalist(s)	Cuba
3rd place, bronze medalist(s)	China
4	United States
5	Netherlands
6	Germany
7	Italy
7	Peru

== Awards ==
- MVP: (Japan) Hitomi Nakamichi
- Best scorer: (Germany) Christiane Fürst
- Best spiker: (Japan) Yukiko Ebata
- Best blocker: (Germany) Christiane Fürst
- Best setter: (Peru) Elena Keldibekova
- Best server: (Japan) Nana Iwasaka
- Best receiver: (Netherlands) Janneke van Tienen
- Best libero: (Netherlands) Janneke van Tienen
