= 2018–19 V.League Division 1 Men's squads =

Japanese volleyball

This article shows the roster of all participating clubs at the 2018–19 V.League Division 1 Men's.

== Panasonic Panthers ==
The following is Panasonic Panthers roster in the 2018–19 V.League Division 1.

Head coach: (Japan) Hiroyuki Furuta

| No. | Name | Date of birth | Height | Weight | Finger height | Highest reachable point | Former team |
|---|---|---|---|---|---|---|---|
| 1 | Kunihiro Shimizu | 11 August 1986 | 1.93 m (6 ft 4 in) | 98 kg (216 lb) | 260 cm (100 in) | 340 cm (130 in) | (Japan) Tokai University |
| 2 | Hideomi Fukatsu (c) | 1 June 1990 | 1.80 m (5 ft 11 in) | 72 kg (159 lb) | 230 cm (91 in) | 325 cm (128 in) | (Japan) Tokai University |
| 3 | Shinya Yamazoe | 23 May 1987 | 1.90 m (6 ft 3 in) | 82 kg (181 lb) | 250 cm (98 in) | 340 cm (130 in) | (Japan) Osaka Sangyo University |
| 4 | Issei Otake | 3 December 1995 | 2.01 m (6 ft 7 in) | 100 kg (220 lb) | 267 cm (105 in) | 346 cm (136 in) | (Germany) United Volleys Frankfurt |
| 5 | Sogo Watanabe | 21 July 1990 | 1.96 m (6 ft 5 in) | 90 kg (200 lb) | 252 cm (99 in) | 340 cm (130 in) | (Japan) Chuo University |
| 6 | Kenji Shirasawa | 21 May 1984 | 1.94 m (6 ft 4 in) | 95 kg (209 lb) | 245 cm (96 in) | 345 cm (136 in) | (Japan) Fukuoka University |
| 7 | Tsubasa Hisahara | 18 March 1995 | 1.88 m (6 ft 2 in) | 77 kg (170 lb) | 243 cm (96 in) | 345 cm (136 in) | (Japan) Tokai University |
| 9 | Takahiko Imamura | 20 May 1993 | 1.93 m (6 ft 4 in) | 91 kg (201 lb) | 255 cm (100 in) | 340 cm (130 in) | (Japan) Chuo University |
| 10 | Akihiro Yamauchi | 30 November 1993 | 2.04 m (6 ft 8 in) | 81 kg (179 lb) | 270 cm (110 in) | 350 cm (140 in) | (Japan) Aichi Gakuin University |
| 11 | Masayuki Ikeda | 4 June 1991 | 1.90 m (6 ft 3 in) | 94 kg (207 lb) | 243 cm (96 in) | 340 cm (130 in) | (Japan) Tokai University |
| 12 | Kazuya Senda | 15 January 1993 | 1.76 m (5 ft 9 in) | 70 kg (150 lb) | 230 cm (91 in) | 320 cm (130 in) | (Japan) Waseda University |
| 13 | Michał Jarosław Kubiak | 23 February 1988 | 1.92 m (6 ft 4 in) | 87 kg (192 lb) | 253 cm (100 in) | 347 cm (137 in) | (Turkey) Halkbank Ankara |
| 15 | Tatsuya Fukuzawa | 1 July 1986 | 1.89 m (6 ft 2 in) | 88 kg (194 lb) | 245 cm (96 in) | 355 cm (140 in) | (Japan) Chuo University |
| 16 | Ryouhei Iga | 29 June 1994 | 1.70 m (5 ft 7 in) | 66 kg (146 lb) | 220 cm (87 in) | 305 cm (120 in) | (Japan) Chuo University |
| 17 | Takeshi Nagano | 11 July 1985 | 1.76 m (5 ft 9 in) | 69 kg (152 lb) | 235 cm (93 in) | 318 cm (125 in) | (Japan) University of Tsukuba |
| 19 | Chen Chien–Chen | 20 November 1989 | 1.88 m (6 ft 2 in) | 88 kg (194 lb) | 240 cm (94 in) | 338 cm (133 in) | (Japan) Voreas Hokkaido |
| 20 | Takahiro Shin | 10 August 1991 | 1.81 m (5 ft 11 in) | 75 kg (165 lb) | 235 cm (93 in) | 325 cm (128 in) | (Japan) Fujitsu Kawasaki Red Spirits |
| 21 | Yasunari Kodama | 24 July 1994 | 1.95 m (6 ft 5 in) | 90 kg (200 lb) | 252 cm (99 in) | 340 cm (130 in) | (Japan) University of Tsukuba |
| 22 | Yuichiro Komiya | 16 November 1992 | 1.93 m (6 ft 4 in) | 82 kg (181 lb) | 250 cm (98 in) | 345 cm (136 in) | (Japan) Toray Arrows |

== Toyoda Gosei Trefuerza ==
The following is Toyoda Gosei Trefuerza roster in the 2018–19 V.League Division 1.

Head coach: (Sweden) Anders Kristiansson

| No. | Name | Date of birth | Height | Weight | Finger height | Highest reachable point | Former team |
|---|---|---|---|---|---|---|---|
| 1 | Shuzo Yamada | 27 November 1992 | 1.93 m (6 ft 4 in) | 78 kg (172 lb) | 243 cm (96 in) | 335 cm (132 in) | (Japan) Nippon Sport Science University |
| 2 | Tetsu Yamachika | 1 October 1990 | 1.93 m (6 ft 4 in) | 77 kg (170 lb) | 245 cm (96 in) | 350 cm (140 in) | (Japan) Kinki Club Sfida |
| 3 | Kenta Shigemura | 3 February 1987 | 1.87 m (6 ft 2 in) | 75 kg (165 lb) | 243 cm (96 in) | 340 cm (130 in) | (Japan) Chuo University |
| 4 | Shohei Uchiyama | 1 November 1987 | 1.84 m (6 ft 0 in) | 74 kg (163 lb) | 243 cm (96 in) | 332 cm (131 in) | (Japan) International Budo University |
| 5 | Issei Maeda | 22 September 1991 | 1.81 m (5 ft 11 in) | 72 kg (159 lb) | 235 cm (93 in) | 320 cm (130 in) | (Japan) Tsukuba United Sun GAIA |
| 6 | Hirotaka Kon | 9 March 1988 | 1.90 m (6 ft 3 in) | 84 kg (185 lb) | 245 cm (96 in) | 340 cm (130 in) | (Japan) Tokai University |
| 7 | Naoya Shiraiwa | 15 February 1990 | 1.90 m (6 ft 3 in) | 83 kg (183 lb) | 240 cm (94 in) | 335 cm (132 in) | (Japan) Chuo University |
| 9 | Takuya Takahashi | 19 October 1993 | 1.89 m (6 ft 2 in) | 90 kg (200 lb) | 240 cm (94 in) | 350 cm (140 in) | (Japan) Senshu University |
| 10 | Koichiro Koga (c) | 30 August 1984 | 1.70 m (5 ft 7 in) | 70 kg (150 lb) | 220 cm (87 in) | 305 cm (120 in) | (Japan) NEC Blue Rockets |
| 11 | Ryota Denda | 3 July 1991 | 1.91 m (6 ft 3 in) | 88 kg (194 lb) | 258 cm (102 in) | 345 cm (136 in) | (Japan) Chuo University |
| 12 | Takuya Takamatsu | 8 January 1988 | 1.86 m (6 ft 1 in) | 82 kg (181 lb) | 240 cm (94 in) | 345 cm (136 in) | (Japan) Nippon Sport Science University |
| 13 | Hideaki Okamoto | 20 December 1983 | 1.90 m (6 ft 3 in) | 86 kg (190 lb) | 245 cm (96 in) | 335 cm (132 in) | (Japan) Osaka Sangyo University |
| 14 | Ryosuke Tsubakiyama | 18 July 1988 | 1.96 m (6 ft 5 in) | 109 kg (240 lb) | 262 cm (103 in) | 340 cm (130 in) | (Japan) Suntory Sunbirds |
| 15 | Igor Omrčen | 26 September 1980 | 2.08 m (6 ft 10 in) | 103 kg (227 lb) | 270 cm (110 in) | 360 cm (140 in) | (Japan) JT Thunders |
| 16 | Yusuke Kurosawa | 24 January 1992 | 1.89 m (6 ft 2 in) | 78 kg (172 lb) | 243 cm (96 in) | 335 cm (132 in) | (Japan) Tokyo Verdy Volleyball Club |
| 17 | Yuma Watanabe | 19 July 1994 | 1.93 m (6 ft 4 in) | 86 kg (190 lb) | 250 cm (98 in) | 343 cm (135 in) | (Japan) Chuo University |
| 18 | Yosuke Arai | 2 July 1991 | 1.86 m (6 ft 1 in) | 78 kg (172 lb) | 240 cm (94 in) | 340 cm (130 in) | (Japan) Chuo University |
| 19 | Taichiro Koga | 4 October 1989 | 1.70 m (5 ft 7 in) | 70 kg (150 lb) | 212 cm (83 in) | 300 cm (120 in) | (Japan) International Budo University |
| 20 | Taichi Kawaguchi | 27 April 1995 | 1.72 m (5 ft 8 in) | 59 kg (130 lb) | 220 cm (87 in) | 308 cm (121 in) | (Japan) Seijo High school |

== Toray Arrows ==
The following is Toray Arrows roster in the 2018–19 V.League Division 1.

Head coach: (Japan) Shinoda Ayumu

| No. | Name | Date of birth | Height | Weight | Finger height | Highest reachable point | Former team |
|---|---|---|---|---|---|---|---|
| 1 | Takaaki Tomimatsu | 20 July 1984 | 1.91 m (6 ft 3 in) | 85 kg (187 lb) | 250 cm (98 in) | 350 cm (140 in) | (Japan) Tokai University |
| 2 | Kentaro Takahashi | 8 February 1995 | 2.01 m (6 ft 7 in) | 93 kg (205 lb) | 260 cm (100 in) | 355 cm (140 in) | (Japan) University of Tsukuba |
| 3 | Yamato Fushimi | 24 December 1991 | 2.07 m (6 ft 9 in) | 113 kg (249 lb) | 268 cm (106 in) | 340 cm (130 in) | (Japan) Juntendo University |
| 4 | Antonin Rouzier | 18 August 1986 | 2.01 m (6 ft 7 in) | 102 kg (225 lb) | 265 cm (104 in) | 350 cm (140 in) | (France) Lycée Jean Perrin |
| 5 | Yuta Yoneyama | 29 August 1984 | 1.85 m (6 ft 1 in) | 80 kg (180 lb) | 235 cm (93 in) | 340 cm (130 in) | (Japan) Nippon Sport Science University |
| 6 | Shunsuke Watanabe | 11 April 1988 | 1.81 m (5 ft 11 in) | 70 kg (150 lb) | 230 cm (91 in) | 315 cm (124 in) | (Japan) Juntendo University |
| 7 | Yudai Minemura | 19 May 1994 | 1.85 m (6 ft 1 in) | 81 kg (179 lb) | 240 cm (94 in) | 320 cm (130 in) | (Japan) Nippon Sport Science University |
| 8 | Tatsuya Setoguchi | 25 May 1988 | 1.85 m (6 ft 1 in) | 80 kg (180 lb) | 240 cm (94 in) | 340 cm (130 in) | (Japan) Kokushikan University |
| 9 | Yuta Abe | 8 August 1981 | 1.91 m (6 ft 3 in) | 82 kg (181 lb) | 246 cm (97 in) | 340 cm (130 in) | (Japan) Suntory Sunbirds |
| 10 | Hidetomo Hoshino (c) | 29 September 1990 | 1.87 m (6 ft 2 in) | 87 kg (192 lb) | 243 cm (96 in) | 331 cm (130 in) | (Japan) Tokai University |
| 11 | Takahiro Tozaki | 14 June 1995 | 1.90 m (6 ft 3 in) | 81 kg (179 lb) | 243 cm (96 in) | 340 cm (130 in) | (Japan) Komazawa University |
| 14 | Keisuke Sakai | 25 August 1996 | 1.87 m (6 ft 2 in) | 76 kg (168 lb) | 240 cm (94 in) | 330 cm (130 in) | (Japan) University of Tsukuba |
| 15 | Haku Ri | 27 December 1990 | 1.93 m (6 ft 4 in) | 82 kg (181 lb) | 245 cm (96 in) | 335 cm (132 in) | (Japan) University of Tsukuba |
| 16 | Kazuki Ochiai | 16 November 1993 | 1.91 m (6 ft 3 in) | 83 kg (183 lb) | 250 cm (98 in) | 340 cm (130 in) | (Japan) Chuo Gakuin University |
| 18 | Yuji Suzuki | 7 June 1986 | 1.89 m (6 ft 2 in) | 78 kg (172 lb) | 245 cm (96 in) | 345 cm (136 in) | (Japan) University of Tsukuba |
| 19 | Satoshi Umeno | 7 November 1989 | 1.74 m (5 ft 9 in) | 78 kg (172 lb) | 230 cm (91 in) | 320 cm (130 in) | (Japan) Nippon Sport Science University |
| 20 | Aung Thu | 10 July 1991 | 1.90 m (6 ft 3 in) | 85 kg (187 lb) | 245 cm (96 in) | 345 cm (136 in) | (Thailand) Nakhon Ratchasima |
| 21 | Naonobu Fujii | 5 January 1992 | 1.83 m (6 ft 0 in) | 80 kg (180 lb) | 232 cm (91 in) | 320 cm (130 in) | (Japan) Juntendo University |
| 22 | Satoshi Ide | 16 January 1992 | 1.74 m (5 ft 9 in) | 70 kg (150 lb) | 225 cm (89 in) | 305 cm (120 in) | (Japan) Dong-A University |

== JT Thunders ==
The following is JT Thunders roster in the 2018–19 V.League Division 1.

Head coach: (Montenegro) Veselin Vuković

| No. | Name | Date of birth | Height | Weight | Finger height | Highest reachable point | Former team |
|---|---|---|---|---|---|---|---|
| 1 | Takuya Yasunaga | 27 March 1990 | 1.93 m (6 ft 4 in) | 85 kg (187 lb) | 246 cm (97 in) | 355 cm (140 in) | (Japan) Tokai University |
| 2 | Taishi Onodera | 27 February 1996 | 2.02 m (6 ft 8 in) | 97 kg (214 lb) | 261 cm (103 in) | 343 cm (135 in) | (Japan) Tokai University |
| 3 | Akihiro Fukatsu | 23 July 1987 | 1.83 m (6 ft 0 in) | 78 kg (172 lb) | 240 cm (94 in) | 337 cm (133 in) | (Japan) Tokai University |
| 4 | Kenta Nakajima | 25 August 1991 | 1.95 m (6 ft 5 in) | 89 kg (196 lb) | 250 cm (98 in) | 348 cm (137 in) | (Japan) Kinki Club Sfida |
| 5 | Shinichiro Inoue | 21 December 1994 | 1.86 m (6 ft 1 in) | 72 kg (159 lb) | 235 cm (93 in) | 338 cm (133 in) | (Japan) Chuo University |
| 6 | Thomas Patrick Edgar | 21 June 1989 | 2.12 m (6 ft 11 in) | 106 kg (234 lb) | 270 cm (110 in) | 360 cm (140 in) | (Argentina) Drean Bolivar |
| 7 | Daisuke Yako | 7 October 1988 | 1.93 m (6 ft 4 in) | 87 kg (192 lb) | 250 cm (98 in) | 355 cm (140 in) | (Japan) Tokai University |
| 8 | Koshi Takechi | 1 January 1996 | 1.86 m (6 ft 1 in) | 78 kg (172 lb) | 238 cm (94 in) | 335 cm (132 in) | (Japan) Chuo University |
| 9 | Kodai Yoshioka | 14 March 1992 | 1.87 m (6 ft 2 in) | 82 kg (181 lb) | 240 cm (94 in) | 341 cm (134 in) | (Japan) Dong-A University |
| 10 | Wataru Inoue | 5 July 1994 | 1.70 m (5 ft 7 in) | 65 kg (143 lb) | 214 cm (84 in) | 300 cm (120 in) | (Japan) Tokai University |
| 11 | Daiki Hisahara | 26 December 1991 | 1.83 m (6 ft 0 in) | 78 kg (172 lb) | 236 cm (93 in) | 325 cm (128 in) | (Japan) Tsukuba United Sun GAIA |
| 12 | Shinpei Goda | 23 September 1992 | 1.72 m (5 ft 8 in) | 69 kg (152 lb) | 222 cm (87 in) | 320 cm (130 in) | (Japan) Panasonic Panthers |
| 14 | Ataru Kumakura | 17 December 1995 | 1.91 m (6 ft 3 in) | 70 kg (150 lb) | 243 cm (96 in) | 347 cm (137 in) | (Japan) Juntendo University |
| 15 | Taishi Karakawa | 12 August 1992 | 1.70 m (5 ft 7 in) | 62 kg (137 lb) | 215 cm (85 in) | 310 cm (120 in) | (Japan) Fukuoka University |
| 16 | Liu Libin | 16 February 1995 | 1.97 m (6 ft 6 in) | 90 kg (200 lb) | 250 cm (98 in) | 350 cm (140 in) | (France) Tourcoing Lille Métropole Volley-Ball |
| 17 | Masaki Kaneko | 23 October 1997 | 1.88 m (6 ft 2 in) | 73 kg (161 lb) | 247 cm (97 in) | 337 cm (133 in) | (Japan) Fukuoka High School |
| 18 | Shohei Yamamoto (c) | 21 March 1991 | 1.87 m (6 ft 2 in) | 72 kg (159 lb) | 238 cm (94 in) | 342 cm (135 in) | (Japan) FC Tokyo |
| 20 | Syogo Toimoto | 25 June 1987 | 1.98 m (6 ft 6 in) | 100 kg (220 lb) | 273 cm (107 in) | 343 cm (135 in) | (Japan) Dong-A University |
| 21 | Kai Rogers | 2 July 1994 | 1.90 m (6 ft 3 in) | 80 kg (180 lb) | 245 cm (96 in) | 340 cm (130 in) | (Japan) University of Tsukuba |

== Suntory Sunbirds ==
The following is Suntory Sunbirds roster in the 2018–19 V.League Division 1.

Head coach: (Japan) Daisuke Sakai

| No. | Name | Date of birth | Height | Weight | Finger height | Highest reachable point | Former team |
|---|---|---|---|---|---|---|---|
| 1 | Taiki Tsuruda | 13 July 1991 | 1.77 m (5 ft 10 in) | 73 kg (161 lb) | 227 cm (89 in) | 335 cm (132 in) | (Japan) Tokai University |
| 2 | Yoshifumi Suzuki | 31 March 1983 | 2.00 m (6 ft 7 in) | 96 kg (212 lb) | 262 cm (103 in) | 350 cm (140 in) | (Japan) Hosei University |
| 3 | Haruki Ono | 27 October 1995 | 1.87 m (6 ft 2 in) | 71 kg (157 lb) | 240 cm (94 in) | 340 cm (130 in) | (Japan) Tokyo Gakugei University |
| 5 | Kentaro Matsubayashi | 8 October 1994 | 1.85 m (6 ft 1 in) | 74 kg (163 lb) | 242 cm (95 in) | 350 cm (140 in) | (Japan) Tokai University |
| 6 | Shogo Okamoto | 30 March 1987 | 1.80 m (5 ft 11 in) | 79 kg (174 lb) | 230 cm (91 in) | 320 cm (130 in) | (Japan) Hosei University |
| 7 | Yu Yamamoto | 9 September 1992 | 1.80 m (5 ft 11 in) | 70 kg (150 lb) | 238 cm (94 in) | 330 cm (130 in) | (Japan) Senshu University |
| 9 | Masaki Oya | 23 April 1995 | 1.78 m (5 ft 10 in) | 72 kg (159 lb) | 230 cm (91 in) | 328 cm (129 in) | (Japan) Dong-A University |
| 10 | Kenya Fujinaka (c) | 25 July 1993 | 1.90 m (6 ft 3 in) | 85 kg (187 lb) | 240 cm (94 in) | 340 cm (130 in) | (Japan) Senshu University |
| 11 | Kosuke Hata | 15 July 1995 | 1.91 m (6 ft 3 in) | 82 kg (181 lb) | 238 cm (94 in) | 338 cm (133 in) | (Japan) University of Tsukuba |
| 12 | Tatsuya Shiota | 17 November 1989 | 1.92 m (6 ft 4 in) | 78 kg (172 lb) | 249 cm (98 in) | 335 cm (132 in) | (Japan) Tokai University |
| 13 | Dmitry Muserskiy | 29 October 1988 | 2.18 m (7 ft 2 in) | 105 kg (231 lb) | 284 cm (112 in) | 375 cm (148 in) | (Russia) VC Belogorie |
| 14 | Hisanori Kato | 7 April 1994 | 1.93 m (6 ft 4 in) | 85 kg (187 lb) | 250 cm (98 in) | 345 cm (136 in) | (Japan) Waseda University |
| 15 | Yoshimitsu Kiire | 13 May 1995 | 1.74 m (5 ft 9 in) | 68 kg (150 lb) | 222 cm (87 in) | 337 cm (133 in) | (Japan) Waseda University |
| 17 | Kentaro Hoshiya | 8 November 1991 | 1.96 m (6 ft 5 in) | 91 kg (201 lb) | 256 cm (101 in) | 340 cm (130 in) | (Japan) Keio University |
| 18 | Takeshi Ogawa | 7 July 1994 | 1.93 m (6 ft 4 in) | 85 kg (187 lb) | 247 cm (97 in) | 350 cm (140 in) | (Japan) Toin Gakuen High school |
| 19 | Masashi Kuriyama | 14 July 1988 | 1.89 m (6 ft 2 in) | 85 kg (187 lb) | 250 cm (98 in) | 350 cm (140 in) | (Japan) Tokyo Verdy Volleyball Club |
| 20 | Tatsuya Yoneyama | 23 September 1986 | 1.83 m (6 ft 0 in) | 83 kg (183 lb) | 235 cm (93 in) | 340 cm (130 in) | (Japan) Nippon Sport Science University |

== JTEKT Stings ==
The following is JTEKT Stings roster in the 2018–19 V.League Division 1.

Head coach: (Japan) Tomoaki Wakayama

| No. | Name | Date of birth | Height | Weight | Finger height | Highest reachable point | Former team |
|---|---|---|---|---|---|---|---|
| 2 | Akitomo Kanamaru | 4 March 1984 | 1.91 m (6 ft 3 in) | 74 kg (163 lb) | 248 cm (98 in) | 340 cm (130 in) | (Japan) Asia University |
| 3 | Shun Watanabe | 11 January 1994 | 1.93 m (6 ft 4 in) | 97 kg (214 lb) | 245 cm (96 in) | 320 cm (130 in) | (Japan) Juntendo University |
| 4 | Taichi Fukuyama | 20 December 1993 | 1.91 m (6 ft 3 in) | 78 kg (172 lb) | 247 cm (97 in) | 335 cm (132 in) | (Japan) Waseda University |
| 5 | Shinichi Seino | 23 May 1988 | 1.86 m (6 ft 1 in) | 80 kg (180 lb) | 237 cm (93 in) | 330 cm (130 in) | (Japan) Tokai University |
| 6 | Valentin Bratoev | 21 October 1987 | 2.02 m (6 ft 8 in) | 97 kg (214 lb) | 260 cm (100 in) | 355 cm (140 in) | (Bulgaria) CSKA Sofia |
| 7 | Kouhei Yanagisawa | 24 May 1993 | 1.88 m (6 ft 2 in) | 78 kg (172 lb) | 243 cm (96 in) | 335 cm (132 in) | (Japan) Tokyo Gakugei University |
| 8 | Hiroya Koori | 6 February 1996 | 1.95 m (6 ft 5 in) | 83 kg (183 lb) | 250 cm (98 in) | 348 cm (137 in) | (Japan) Nihon University |
| 9 | Masatoshi Tatsumi | 9 January 1989 | 1.89 m (6 ft 2 in) | 80 kg (180 lb) | 245 cm (96 in) | 325 cm (128 in) | (Japan) Chuo University |
| 10 | Kosuke Matsubara | 4 July 1985 | 1.80 m (5 ft 11 in) | 72 kg (159 lb) | 235 cm (93 in) | 330 cm (130 in) | (Japan) Juntendo University |
| 11 | Ryosuke Hakamaya | 1 November 1988 | 1.92 m (6 ft 4 in) | 83 kg (183 lb) | 245 cm (96 in) | 340 cm (130 in) | (Japan) Nippon Sport Science University |
| 12 | Ryo Kohrogi | 14 August 1983 | 1.80 m (5 ft 11 in) | 68 kg (150 lb) | 230 cm (91 in) | 325 cm (128 in) | (Japan) Aichi Gakuin University |
| 14 | Yūji Nishida | 30 January 2000 | 1.87 m (6 ft 2 in) | 82 kg (181 lb) | 240 cm (94 in) | 350 cm (140 in) | (Japan) Inabe Shiritsu Daian Junior High school |
| 15 | Souta Nakane | 2 March 1996 | 1.73 m (5 ft 8 in) | 68 kg (150 lb) | 222 cm (87 in) | 315 cm (124 in) | (Japan) University of Tsukuba |
| 16 | Sho Kuboyama | 4 February 1992 | 1.80 m (5 ft 11 in) | 72 kg (159 lb) | 228 cm (90 in) | 325 cm (128 in) | (Japan) Dong-A University |
| 17 | Ryuta Honma | 17 October 1991 | 1.78 m (5 ft 10 in) | 74 kg (163 lb) | 233 cm (92 in) | 330 cm (130 in) | (Japan) Waseda University |
| 18 | Zhen Qin | 14 February 1993 | 2.06 m (6 ft 9 in) | 97 kg (214 lb) | 270 cm (110 in) | 355 cm (140 in) | (China) Tianjin Volleyball |
| 19 | Hiroaki Asano (c) | 6 October 1990 | 1.78 m (5 ft 10 in) | 70 kg (150 lb) | 230 cm (91 in) | 330 cm (130 in) | (Japan) Aichi University |
| 21 | Yuki Hirose | 13 December 1992 | 1.97 m (6 ft 6 in) | 98 kg (216 lb) | 250 cm (98 in) | 330 cm (130 in) | (Japan) Kasumigaura High School |

== Osaka Blazers Sakai ==
The following is Osaka Blazers Sakai roster in the 2018–19 V.League Division 1.

Head coach: (Japan) Toru Uesugi

| No. | Name | Date of birth | Height | Weight | Finger height | Highest reachable point | Former team |
|---|---|---|---|---|---|---|---|
| 1 | Yoshihiko Matsumoto | 7 January 1981 | 1.93 m (6 ft 4 in) | 80 kg (180 lb) | 256 cm (101 in) | 352 cm (139 in) | (Japan) NEC Blue Rockets |
| 3 | Takato Miyahara | 15 July 1995 | 1.96 m (6 ft 5 in) | 84 kg (185 lb) | 259 cm (102 in) | 344 cm (135 in) | (Japan) Nippon Sport Science University |
| 4 | Naoya Takano | 30 April 1993 | 1.90 m (6 ft 3 in) | 79 kg (174 lb) | 248 cm (98 in) | 342 cm (135 in) | (Japan) University of East Asia |
| 5 | Kazuya Naito | 25 November 1987 | 1.89 m (6 ft 2 in) | 79 kg (174 lb) | 247 cm (97 in) | 347 cm (137 in) | (Japan) Chuo University |
| 6 | Takaya Yamazaki | 11 April 1995 | 1.93 m (6 ft 4 in) | 92 kg (203 lb) | 245 cm (96 in) | 340 cm (130 in) | (Japan) Waseda University |
| 7 | Takashi Dekita | 13 August 1991 | 2.00 m (6 ft 7 in) | 92 kg (203 lb) | 255 cm (100 in) | 357 cm (141 in) | (Japan) Tsukuba United Sun GAIA |
| 8 | Sho Sagawa | 11 February 1991 | 1.81 m (5 ft 11 in) | 75 kg (165 lb) | 235 cm (93 in) | 331 cm (130 in) | (Japan) Kwansei Gakuin University |
| 9 | Tomohisa Tsutsumi | 6 October 1993 | 1.93 m (6 ft 4 in) | 93 kg (205 lb) | 258 cm (102 in) | 350 cm (140 in) | (Japan) Juntendo University |
| 10 | Shunsuke Chijiki | 6 September 1989 | 1.94 m (6 ft 4 in) | 90 kg (200 lb) | 246 cm (97 in) | 349 cm (137 in) | (Japan) Chuo University |
| 11 | Masahiro Sekita | 20 November 1993 | 1.76 m (5 ft 9 in) | 73 kg (161 lb) | 225 cm (89 in) | 320 cm (130 in) | (Japan) Panasonic Panthers |
| 12 | Yuki Koike | 4 April 1995 | 1.83 m (6 ft 0 in) | 73 kg (161 lb) | 235 cm (93 in) | 328 cm (129 in) | (Japan) University of Tsukuba |
| 13 | Yuta Matsuoka | 6 November 1989 | 1.92 m (6 ft 4 in) | 83 kg (183 lb) | 255 cm (100 in) | 344 cm (135 in) | (Japan) Aichi Gakuin University |
| 14 | Shohei Yamaguchi (c) | 21 July 1994 | 1.74 m (5 ft 9 in) | 70 kg (150 lb) | 223 cm (88 in) | 315 cm (124 in) | (Japan) Waseda University |
| 16 | Ryosuke Imadomi | 22 October 1993 | 1.70 m (5 ft 7 in) | 66 kg (146 lb) | 215 cm (85 in) | 312 cm (123 in) | (Japan) Fukuoka University |
| 18 | Nikola Gjorgiev | 23 July 1988 | 1.95 m (6 ft 5 in) | 86 kg (190 lb) | 252 cm (99 in) | 353 cm (139 in) | (Poland) ONICO Warszawa |
| 20 | Tomohiro Yamamoto | 5 November 1994 | 1.71 m (5 ft 7 in) | 69 kg (152 lb) | 220 cm (87 in) | 299 cm (118 in) | (Japan) FC Tokyo |
| 21 | Yutaro Takemoto | 21 February 1995 | 1.99 m (6 ft 6 in) | 84 kg (185 lb) | 263 cm (104 in) | 345 cm (136 in) | (Japan) Tokyo Gakugei University |

== FC Tokyo ==
The following is FC Tokyo roster in the 2018–19 V.League Division 1.

Head coach: (Japan) Masayasu Sakamoto

| No. | Name | Date of birth | Height | Weight | Finger height | Highest reachable point | Former team |
|---|---|---|---|---|---|---|---|
| 2 | Kentaro Tamaya | 30 January 1992 | 1.87 m (6 ft 2 in) | 75 kg (165 lb) | 240 cm (94 in) | 330 cm (130 in) | (Japan) Osaka Blazers Sakai |
| 3 | Yuya Tachibana | 1 March 1989 | 1.72 m (5 ft 8 in) | 70 kg (150 lb) | 221 cm (87 in) | 305 cm (120 in) | (Japan) Oita Miyoshi Weisse Adler |
| 4 | Yohei Yamada | 9 October 1988 | 1.85 m (6 ft 1 in) | 79 kg (174 lb) | 238 cm (94 in) | 330 cm (130 in) | (Japan) Oita Miyoshi Weisse Adler |
| 9 | Dai Tezuka | 18 November 1988 | 1.91 m (6 ft 3 in) | 90 kg (200 lb) | 245 cm (96 in) | 345 cm (136 in) | (Japan) Chuo Gakuin University |
| 10 | Jason DeRocco | 19 September 1989 | 1.98 m (6 ft 6 in) | 94 kg (207 lb) | 270 cm (110 in) | 342 cm (135 in) | (Poland) Jastrzębski Węgiel |
| 12 | Hirotaka Odashima | 22 July 1991 | 1.91 m (6 ft 3 in) | 80 kg (180 lb) | 250 cm (98 in) | 335 cm (132 in) | (Japan) Komazawa University |
| 14 | Yuma Nagatomo (c) | 22 December 1991 | 1.80 m (5 ft 11 in) | 81 kg (179 lb) | 240 cm (94 in) | 325 cm (128 in) | (Japan) Senshu University |
| 16 | Shin Tehara | 14 April 1993 | 1.80 m (5 ft 11 in) | 67 kg (148 lb) | 230 cm (91 in) | 315 cm (124 in) | (Japan) Ryukoku University |
| 17 | Naoto Tomita | 10 May 1994 | 1.87 m (6 ft 2 in) | 85 kg (187 lb) | 243 cm (96 in) | 333 cm (131 in) | (Japan) Senshu University |
| 18 | Hideyuki Kuriyama | 15 July 1993 | 1.89 m (6 ft 2 in) | 85 kg (187 lb) | 249 cm (98 in) | 340 cm (130 in) | (Japan) Tokai University |
| 19 | Nozomi Sato | 14 September 1994 | 1.84 m (6 ft 0 in) | 75 kg (165 lb) | 243 cm (96 in) | 335 cm (132 in) | (Japan) Chuo Gakuin University |
| 21 | Ryosuke Hirata | 18 May 1995 | 1.87 m (6 ft 2 in) | 79 kg (174 lb) | 240 cm (94 in) | 340 cm (130 in) | (Japan) Chuo University |
| 22 | Kazuki Miyahara | 28 June 1995 | 1.83 m (6 ft 0 in) | 74 kg (163 lb) | 235 cm (93 in) | 325 cm (128 in) | (Japan) Tokai University |
| 23 | Ikumi Komori | 3 October 1995 | 1.86 m (6 ft 1 in) | 74 kg (163 lb) | 243 cm (96 in) | 320 cm (130 in) | (Japan) Senshu University |
| 24 | Shohei Nose | 20 July 1993 | 1.70 m (5 ft 7 in) | 65 kg (143 lb) | 225 cm (89 in) | 310 cm (120 in) | (Japan) Keio University |
| 25 | Yoshiki Ohmi | 16 April 1997 | 1.90 m (6 ft 3 in) | 89 kg (196 lb) | 243 cm (96 in) | 330 cm (130 in) | (Japan) Sundai Gakuen Senior High School |
| 26 | Ayato Kuroda | 30 January 1996 | 1.83 m (6 ft 0 in) | 79 kg (174 lb) | 232 cm (91 in) | 330 cm (130 in) | (Japan) Keio University |
| 27 | Kenta Suzuki | 9 August 1992 | 1.91 m (6 ft 3 in) | 80 kg (180 lb) | 240 cm (94 in) | 340 cm (130 in) | (Japan) Osaka Sangyo University |
| 29 | Jin Inoue | 2 April 1992 | 1.96 m (6 ft 5 in) | 84 kg (185 lb) | 250 cm (98 in) | 340 cm (130 in) | (Japan) Tokyo Gakugei University |
