= Ran Takahashi =

Japanese volleyball player (born 2001)

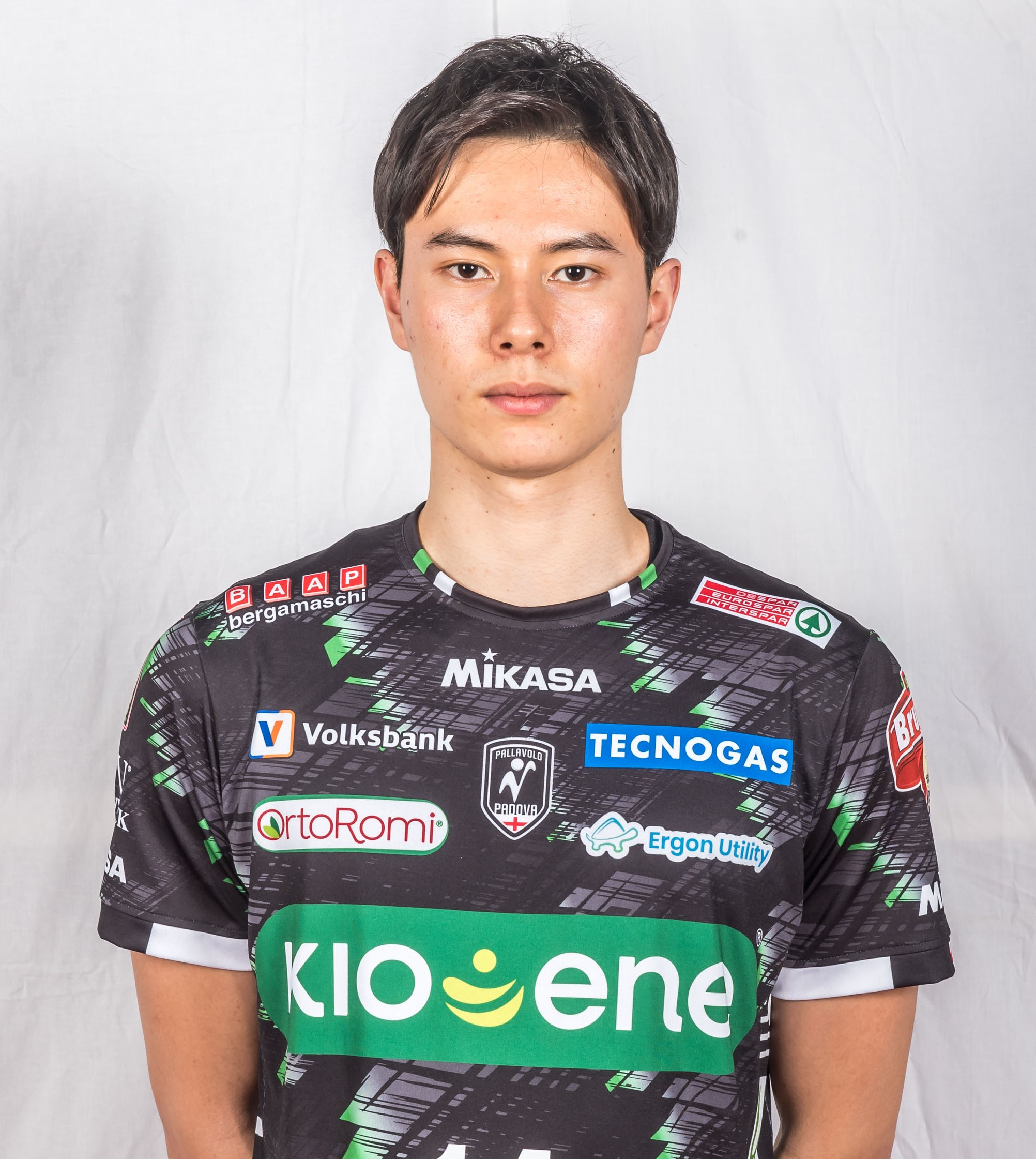
- Takahashi in 2021

Personal information
- Full name: Ran Takahashi
- Nationality: Japanese
- Born: 2 September 2001 (age 25) Kyoto, Japan
- Education: Nippon Sport Science University
- Height: 188 cm (6 ft 2 in)
- Weight: 84 kg (185 lb)
- Spike: 343 cm (135 in)
- Block: 315 cm (124 in)

Volleyball information
- Position: Outside Hitter
- Current club: LKPS Lublin
- Number: 12 (National); 13 (University); 12 (Club)

Career
- Years: Team
- 2017–2020: (Japan) Higashiyama High School
- 2020–2024: (Japan) Nippon Sport Science University
- 2021–2023: (Italy) Pallavolo Padova
- 2023–2024: (Italy) Vero Volley Monza
- 2024–2026: (Japan) Suntory Sunbirds
- 2026–: (Poland) LKPS Lublin

National team
- Years: Team
- 2021–present: Japan
Medal Record
Men's Volleyball
Representing Japan
FIVB Nations League
Silver medal – second place	2024 Łódź	Team
Bronze medal – third place	2023 Gdańsk	Team
Asian Championship
Gold medal – first place	2023 Urmia	Team
Gold medal – first place	2026 Fukuoka	Team
Silver medal – second place	2021 Chiba/Funabashi	Team

YouTube information
- Channel: RanRui
- Years active: 2021–present
- Genre: Vlog
- Subscribers: 378 thousand
- Views: 32.62 million
- Last updated: September 4, 2026

Ran Takahashi (髙橋 藍, Takahashi Ran; born 2 September 2001) is a Japanese volleyball player who plays as an outside hitter for TauronLiga club LKPS Lublin and the Japan national team.

He previously played for Suntory Sunbirds in Japan's SV.League, Pallavolo Padova and Vero Volley Monza in the Italian Volleyball League, as well as Nippon Sport Science University at collegiate level.

== Biography ==
Ran Takahashi was born on 2 September 2001 in Kyoto Prefecture, Japan. His mother is Japanese of part British and German descent, and his father is Japanese. Ran has one brother, Rui, who is one and a half year older, and one younger sister, Riri. He started playing volleyball following the footsteps of his brother. His sister also plays volleyball.

== Career ==
=== Elementary School Years ===
Ran started playing volleyball in his second grade of elementary school for the school's team.

=== High School Years ===
Ran played for Kyoto Municipal Hachigaoka Junior High School. Because of his height, in the first grade, he was mainly used as a Libero.

Afterward, he attended Higashiyama High School, and he was in the starting line up in high school since his first year and served as an ace and captain of his team by the third year. He led his team to the Top 4 of the National High School Sports Championship, also known as "Inter-High". His team also won the 2019 National Sports Festival (Kokutai) of Japan, as well as the 2020 All Japan High School Volleyball Championship, also known as "Haruko." In addition, he received the "Most Valuable Player" award at the end of the competition.

He has no under category experience at all, but he was immediately elected as a senior representative in February 2020 while he was still in the 3rd grade of high school.

=== College Years and International Success ===
After graduating from high school, Takahashi entered Nippon Sport Science University. He led the team, receiving the Runner-Up place in the 2020 All Japan Intercollegiate Volleyball Championship, and got the Best Scorer award from the competition. In 2021, he was one of the Outside Hitters for the Japan men's national volleyball team at the 2020 Summer Olympics held in Tokyo, Japan.

After winning 2nd place at the Asian Men's Volleyball Championship with the Japan men's national volleyball team, he returned to play for his college team in the 2021 Kanto University Men's Division 1 League, winning 1st place by defeating Waseda University in straight sets. He also played for his college team in the 2021 All Japan Intercollegiate Volleyball Championship, but lost in the quarterfinals against Jutendo University.

On November 29, it was announced that Takahashi would play in the Italian Volleyball League Division 1 with Pallavolo Padova. He arrived Italy on December and signed 14 as his jersey number, the same as Yūki Ishikawa's when he played with Padova.

On December 19, Ran debuted in the Italian Volleyball League as a substitute in the third set against Modena Volley. Pallavolo Padova announced that Ran has renewed his contract with the club for Season 2022–2023. He was nominated as MVP of the match against Valsa Group Modena for the first time in the Italian league.

From 2023 until 2024, Vero Volley Monza signed with Ran Takahashi for the Italian Volleyball League. He later signed with Suntory Sunbirds in 2024 and made his debut in the Japanese Volleyball League. As of right now, he has signed with LKPS Lublin and is set to make his debut in the PlusLiga.

At the 2024 Summer Olympics held in Paris, France, Takahashi made his second Olympics appearance alongside Japan men's national volleyball team. They reached the quarterfinals but eventually lost to Italy men's national volleyball team.

== Clubs ==
- (Japan) Higashiyama High School (2017–2020)
- (Japan) Nippon Sport Science University (2020–2024)
- (Italy) Pallavolo Padova (2021–2023)
- (Italy) Vero Volley Monza (2023–2024)
- (Japan) Suntory Sunbirds (2024–2026)
- (Poland) LKPS Lublin (2026–present)

== Personal life ==
He owns an Instagram account with 2.5 million followers, a YouTube and a TikTok channel with his brother, called RanRui, which is a portmanteau of their given names.

Ran Takahashi: The First Photobook, a career retrospective, was released on August 22, 2022. Ran Takahashi: Colorful Days, his first official photo-essay book, was released on March 29, 2023.

== Awards ==
=== Individual ===
- 2020 All Japan High School Volleyball Championship – Most Valuable Player
- 2020 All Japan Intercollegiate Volleyball Championship – Best Scorer
- 2023 Asian Championship – Best Outside Spiker
- 2023 Anan Awards – Anan Award for Athlete Category
- 2023–24 Italian Superlega – Best Receiver
- 2024–25 SV.League Men's – Finals Most Valuable Player
- 2024–25 SV.League Men's – Best Outside Hitter (Best 6)
- 2024–25 SV.League Men's – Receiver of the Year
- 2024–25 SV.League Men's – Attack the Top Award
- 2024 Emperor's Cup – Most Valuable Player
- 2025 AVC Men's Champions League – Best Outside Spiker
- 2025–26 SV.League Men's – Best Outside Hitter (Best 6)
- 2025–26 SV.League Men's – Receiver of the Year
- 2026 VNL Men's – Week 2 Most Valuable Player
- 2026 Asian Championship – Most Valuable Player
- 2026 Asian Championship – Best Outside Spiker

=== High School ===
- 2017 Kinki High School Volleyball Championship – Runner-Up, with Higashiyama High School
- 2018 Kinki High School Volleyball Championship – Runner-Up, with Higashiyama High School
- 2019 Kinki High School Volleyball Championship – Champion, with Higashiyama High School
- 2019 All Japan High School Athletic Meet Volleyball Tournament – 3rd Place, with Higashiyama High School
- 2019 National Sports Festival Volleyball Competition – Champion, with Higashiyama High School
- 2020 All Japan High School Volleyball Championship – Champion, with Higashiyama High School

=== College ===
- 2020 All Japan Intercollegiate Volleyball Championship – Runner-Up, with Nippon Sport Science University
- 2021 Kanto University Men's Division 1 League – Champion, with Nippon Sport Science University

=== National Team ===
- 2021 Asian Championship – Runner-Up
- 2023 Volleyball Nations League – 3rd Place
- 2023 Asian Championship – Champion
- 2023 World Cup – Runner-Up
- 2024 Volleyball Nations League – Runner-Up
- 2026 Asian Championship – Champion

=== Club Team ===
- Vero Volley Monza
  - 2023–24 Italian Superlega – Runner-Up
  - 2023–24 Coppa Italia – Runner-Up
  - 2023–24 CEV Challenge Cup – Runner-Up
- Suntory Sunbirds
  - 2024–25 SV.League Men's – Champion
  - 2024–25 SV.League Men's – Regular Season Runner-Up
  - 2024 Emperor's Cup – Champion
  - 2025 AVC Champions League – 3rd Place
  - 2025–26 SV.League Men's – Runner-Up
  - 2025–26 SV.League Men's – Regular Season Champion

== Ambassadorship ==
Takahashi's brand ambassadorships include Suntory Sports, French luxury fashion house Dior, Japanese sportswear Asics, Japanese makeup brand Kosé, Japanese health and wellness brand Sunchlorella, and Filipino electronics company Akari.

Alongside his brother Rui, Ran also serves as an official Kyoto Prefecture Cultural Tourism Ambassador since May 2025.
