= 2017 Asian Men's Volleyball Championship =

International volleyball tournament

Tournament details
- Host country: Indonesia
- City: Gresik
- Dates: 24 July – 1 August
- Teams: 16 (from 1 confederation)
- Venue: 2 (in 1 host city)

Final positions
- Champions: Japan (9th title)
- Runners-up: Kazakhstan
- Third place: South Korea
- Fourth place: Indonesia

Tournament awards
- MVP: (Japan) Yūki Ishikawa

The 2017 Asian Men's Volleyball Championship was the nineteenth staging of the Asian Men's Volleyball Championship, the biennial international men's volleyball championship of Asia organised by the Asian Volleyball Confederation (AVC) with Indonesian Volleyball Federation (PBVSI). The tournament was held in Gresik, Indonesia from 24 July to 1 August 2017.

== Qualification ==
The 16 AVC member associations submitted their men's national team to the 2017 Asian Championship. The 16 AVC member associations were from 5 zonal associations, including, Central Asia (4 teams), East Asia (5 teams), Oceania (1 team), Southeast Asia (3 teams), and West Asian teams (3 teams).

=== Qualified teams ===
The following teams qualified for the tournament.

Means of qualification	Berths	Qualified
Host Country	1	Indonesia
Central Asian teams	4	Iran
Central Asian teams	4	Kazakhstan
Central Asian teams	4	Pakistan
Central Asian teams	4	Sri Lanka
East Asian teams	5	China
East Asian teams	5	Chinese Taipei
East Asian teams	5	Hong Kong
East Asian teams	5	Japan
East Asian teams	5	South Korea
Oceanian team	1	Australia
Southeast Asian teams	2	Thailand
Southeast Asian teams	2	Vietnam
West Asian teams	3	Iraq
West Asian teams	3	Qatar
West Asian teams	3	Saudi Arabia
Total 16

== Pools composition ==
=== Preliminary round ===
Teams were seeded in the first two positions of each pool following the serpentine system according to their FIVB World Ranking as of 22 August 2016. AVC reserved the right to seed the hosts as head of pool A regardless of the World Ranking. All teams not seeded were drawn in Bangkok, Thailand on 27 February 2017. Rankings are shown in brackets except the hosts who ranked 42nd.

Seeded Teams
Pool A	Pool B	Pool C	Pool D
Indonesia (Hosts); Qatar (36)	Iran (7); Chinese Taipei (33)	Japan (14); South Korea (22)	Australia (15); China (20)
Unseeded Teams
Kazakhstan (36); Thailand (42) Pakistan (50); Saudi Arabia (50) Sri Lanka (77); Iraq (77) Hong Kong (77); Vietnam (77)

Draw

Pool A	Pool B	Pool C	Pool D
Indonesia	Iran	Japan	Australia
Qatar	Chinese Taipei	South Korea	China
Kazakhstan	Pakistan	Vietnam	Thailand
Saudi Arabia	Iraq	Sri Lanka	Hong Kong

=== Classification round ===
Final eight				9th–16th places			
Pool E		Pool F		Pool G		Pool H	
1A	Kazakhstan	1B	Iran	3A	Qatar	3B	Pakistan
1C	South Korea	1D	Australia	3C	Vietnam	3D	Thailand
2A	Indonesia	2B	Chinese Taipei	4A	Saudi Arabia	4B	Iraq
2C	Japan	2D	China	4C	Sri Lanka	4D	Hong Kong

== Venues ==
Preliminary round, Pool E, F and Final eight	Preliminary round, Pool G, H, 13th–16th places and 9th–12th places
Gresik, Indonesia
Tri Dharma Petrokimia Gymnasium	Wahana Ekspresi Poesponegoro Gymnasium
Capacity: Unknown	Capacity: Unknown

== Pool standing procedure ==
1. Number of matches won
2. Match points
3. Sets ratio
4. Points ratio
5. If the tie continues as per the point ratio between two teams, the priority will be given to the team which won the last match between them. When the tie in points ratio is between three or more teams, a new classification of these teams in the terms of points 1, 2 and 3 will be made taking into consideration only the matches in which they were opposed to each other.

Match won 3–0 or 3–1: 3 match points for the winner, 0 match points for the loser
Match won 3–2: 2 match points for the winner, 1 match point for the loser

== Preliminary round ==
- All times are Indonesia Western Time (UTC+07:00).

=== Pool A ===
Pos	Team	Pld	W	L	Pts	SW	SL	SR	SPW	SPL	SPR	Qualification
1	Kazakhstan	3	3	0	7	9	4	2.250	290	264	1.098	Final eight (Pools E and F)
2	Indonesia	3	2	1	6	8	6	1.333	310	307	1.010	Final eight (Pools E and F)
3	Qatar	3	1	2	5	7	6	1.167	281	272	1.033	9th–16th places (Pools G and H)
4	Saudi Arabia	3	0	3	0	1	9	0.111	210	248	0.847	9th–16th places (Pools G and H)

Date	Time	Venue		Score		Set 1	Set 2	Set 3	Set 4	Set 5	Total	Report
24 Jul	11:30	TDP	Indonesia	3–1	Saudi Arabia	25–23	25–21	22–25	26–24		98–93	P2
24 Jul	16:30	TDP	Qatar	2–3	Kazakhstan	25–18	25–20	24–26	19–25	10–15	103–104	P2
25 Jul	14:11	TDP	Saudi Arabia	0–3	Qatar	23–25	21–25	21–25			65–75	P2
25 Jul	16:30	TDP	Indonesia	2–3	Kazakhstan	25–23	25–27	21–25	25–21	13–15	109–111	P2
26 Jul	11:30	TDP	Kazakhstan	3–0	Saudi Arabia	25–13	25–22	25–17			75–52	P2
26 Jul	16:30	TDP	Indonesia	3–2	Qatar	24–26	14–25	25–20	25–21	15–11	103–103	P2

=== Pool B ===
Pos	Team	Pld	W	L	Pts	SW	SL	SR	SPW	SPL	SPR	Qualification
1	Iran	3	3	0	9	9	0	MAX	230	182	1.264	Final eight (Pools E and F)
2	Chinese Taipei	3	2	1	6	6	3	2.000	220	194	1.134	Final eight (Pools E and F)
3	Pakistan	3	1	2	3	3	7	0.429	199	238	0.836	9th–16th places (Pools G and H)
4	Iraq	3	0	3	0	1	9	0.111	209	244	0.857	9th–16th places (Pools G and H)

Date	Time	Venue		Score		Set 1	Set 2	Set 3	Set 4	Set 5	Total	Report
24 Jul	11:30	WEP	Chinese Taipei	3–0	Pakistan	25–17	25–16	25–14			75–47	P2
24 Jul	14:00	WEP	Iran	3–0	Iraq	25–17	25–16	25–21			75–54	P2
25 Jul	11:30	WEP	Iraq	0–3	Chinese Taipei	24–26	21–25	22–25			67–76	P2
25 Jul	14:00	WEP	Iran	3–0	Pakistan	25–23	25–22	25–14			75–59	P2
26 Jul	11:30	WEP	Pakistan	3–1	Iraq	26–24	25–17	17–25	25–22		93–88	P2
26 Jul	14:05	WEP	Iran	3–0	Chinese Taipei	25–20	30–28	25–21			80–69	P2

=== Pool C ===
Pos	Team	Pld	W	L	Pts	SW	SL	SR	SPW	SPL	SPR	Qualification
1	South Korea	3	3	0	8	9	2	4.500	253	207	1.222	Final eight (Pools E and F)
2	Japan	3	2	1	7	8	3	2.667	249	203	1.227	Final eight (Pools E and F)
3	Vietnam	3	1	2	2	3	8	0.375	204	249	0.819	9th–16th places (Pools G and H)
4	Sri Lanka	3	0	3	1	2	9	0.222	204	251	0.813	9th–16th places (Pools G and H)

Date	Time	Venue		Score		Set 1	Set 2	Set 3	Set 4	Set 5	Total	Report
24 Jul	18:45	WEP	Japan	3–0	Sri Lanka	25–17	25–16	25–17			75–50	P2
24 Jul	19:20	TDP	South Korea	3–0	Vietnam	25–17	25–19	25–17			75–53	P2
25 Jul	18:50	WEP	Sri Lanka	0–3	South Korea	15–25	20–25	20–25			55–75	P2
25 Jul	19:20	TDP	Japan	3–0	Vietnam	25–13	25–19	25–18			75–50	P2
26 Jul	19:00	WEP	Vietnam	3–2	Sri Lanka	25–19	16–25	25–21	20–25	15–9	101–99	P2
26 Jul	19:00	TDP	Japan	2–3	South Korea	22–25	25–21	25–17	18–25	9–15	99–103	P2

=== Pool D ===
Pos	Team	Pld	W	L	Pts	SW	SL	SR	SPW	SPL	SPR	Qualification
1	Australia	3	3	0	8	9	2	4.500	261	210	1.243	Final eight (Pools E and F)
2	China	3	2	1	6	6	3	2.000	214	183	1.169	Final eight (Pools E and F)
3	Thailand	3	1	2	4	5	7	0.714	254	262	0.969	9th–16th places (Pools G and H)
4	Hong Kong	3	0	3	0	1	9	0.111	174	248	0.702	9th–16th places (Pools G and H)

Date	Time	Venue		Score		Set 1	Set 2	Set 3	Set 4	Set 5	Total	Report
24 Jul	14:10	TDP	China	3–0	Thailand	25–19	29–27	25–13			79–59	P2
24 Jul	16:30	WEP	Australia	3–0	Hong Kong	25–17	25–20	25–16			75–53	P2
25 Jul	11:30	TDP	Australia	3–2	Thailand	19–25	26–28	25–19	25–14	15–11	110–97	P2
25 Jul	16:30	WEP	Hong Kong	0–3	China	13–25	16–25	19–25			48–75	P2
26 Jul	14:00	TDP	Thailand	3–1	Hong Kong	23–25	25–8	25–19	25–21		98–73	P2
26 Jul	16:30	WEP	Australia	3–0	China	26–24	25–13	25–23			76–60	P2

== Classification round ==
- All times are Indonesia Western Time (UTC+07:00).
- The results and the points of the matches between the same teams that were already played during the preliminary round shall be taken into account for the classification round.

=== Pool E ===
Pos	Team	Pld	W	L	Pts	SW	SL	SR	SPW	SPL	SPR	Qualification
1	South Korea	3	3	0	8	9	4	2.250	296	254	1.165	Quarterfinals
2	Japan	3	2	1	7	8	3	2.667	249	213	1.169	Quarterfinals
3	Kazakhstan	3	1	2	2	4	8	0.500	250	282	0.887	Quarterfinals
4	Indonesia	3	0	3	1	3	9	0.333	235	281	0.836	Quarterfinals

Date	Time		Score		Set 1	Set 2	Set 3	Set 4	Set 5	Total	Report
27 Jul	16:30	Kazakhstan	0–3	Japan	18–25	19–25	23–25			60–75	P2
27 Jul	19:00	South Korea	3–1	Indonesia	25–21	20–25	25–14	25–16		95–76	P2
29 Jul	16:30	Kazakhstan	1–3	South Korea	18–25	25–23	23–25	13–25		79–98	P2
29 Jul	19:00	Indonesia	0–3	Japan	23–25	15–25	12–25			50–75	P2

=== Pool F ===
Pos	Team	Pld	W	L	Pts	SW	SL	SR	SPW	SPL	SPR	Qualification
1	Iran	3	2	1	6	6	4	1.500	241	218	1.106	Quarterfinals
2	Chinese Taipei	3	2	1	6	6	5	1.200	264	256	1.031	Quarterfinals
3	Australia	3	1	2	3	5	6	0.833	232	256	0.906	Quarterfinals
4	China	3	1	2	3	4	6	0.667	229	236	0.970	Quarterfinals

Date	Time		Score		Set 1	Set 2	Set 3	Set 4	Set 5	Total	Report
27 Jul	11:30	Australia	1–3	Chinese Taipei	23–25	17–25	26–24	18–25		84–99	P2
27 Jul	14:00	Iran	0–3	China	25–27	19–25	20–25			64–77	P2
29 Jul	11:30	China	1–3	Chinese Taipei	22–25	25–19	25–27	20–25		92–96	P2
29 Jul	14:00	Iran	3–1	Australia	25–11	25–19	22–25	25–17		97–72	P2

=== Pool G ===
Pos	Team	Pld	W	L	Pts	SW	SL	SR	SPW	SPL	SPR	Qualification
1	Qatar	3	2	1	7	8	4	2.000	277	260	1.065	9th–12th semifinals
2	Vietnam	3	2	1	5	7	6	1.167	291	286	1.017	9th–12th semifinals
3	Sri Lanka	3	1	2	3	6	8	0.750	297	303	0.980	13th–16th semifinals
4	Saudi Arabia	3	1	2	3	4	7	0.571	252	268	0.940	13th–16th semifinals

Date	Time		Score		Set 1	Set 2	Set 3	Set 4	Set 5	Total	Report
27 Jul	11:30	Qatar	2–3	Sri Lanka	25–19	24–26	20–25	25–23	12–15	106–108	P2
27 Jul	17:20	Vietnam	3–1	Saudi Arabia	24–26	25–21	29–27	25–17		103–91	P2
29 Jul	11:30	Qatar	3–1	Vietnam	25–22	25–15	19–25	27–25		96–87	P2
29 Jul	16:30	Saudi Arabia	3–1	Sri Lanka	25–17	27–25	19–25	25–23		96–90	P2

=== Pool H ===
Pos	Team	Pld	W	L	Pts	SW	SL	SR	SPW	SPL	SPR	Qualification
1	Thailand	3	3	0	9	9	2	4.500	269	219	1.228	9th–12th semifinals
2	Pakistan	3	2	1	5	6	6	1.000	266	261	1.019	9th–12th semifinals
3	Iraq	3	1	2	3	5	7	0.714	267	266	1.004	13th–16th semifinals
4	Hong Kong	3	0	3	1	4	9	0.444	248	304	0.816	13th–16th semifinals

Date	Time		Score		Set 1	Set 2	Set 3	Set 4	Set 5	Total	Report
27 Jul	14:30	Pakistan	3–2	Hong Kong	21–25	22–25	25–20	25–21	15–6	108–97	P2
27 Jul	20:10	Thailand	3–1	Iraq	20–25	25–12	25–23	25–21		95–81	P2
29 Jul	14:00	Pakistan	0–3	Thailand	18–25	24–26	23–25			65–76	P2
29 Jul	19:05	Iraq	3–1	Hong Kong	25–13	25–22	23–25	25–18		98–78	P2

== Final round ==
- All times are Indonesia Western Time (UTC+07:00).

=== 13th–16th places ===
13th–16th semifinals
30 July
Sri Lanka	3
Hong Kong	0
30 July
Iraq	3
Saudi Arabia	0

13th place match
31 July
Sri Lanka	1
Iraq	3
15th place match
31 July
Hong Kong	0
Saudi Arabia	3

==== 13th–16th semifinals ====
Date	Time		Score		Set 1	Set 2	Set 3	Set 4	Set 5	Total	Report
30 Jul	11:30	Sri Lanka	3–0	Hong Kong	25–18	25–13	25–17			75–48	P2
30 Jul	14:00	Iraq	3–0	Saudi Arabia	25–20	25–19	25–17			75–56	P2

==== 15th place match ====
Date	Time		Score		Set 1	Set 2	Set 3	Set 4	Set 5	Total	Report
31 Jul	11:30	Hong Kong	0–3	Saudi Arabia	17–25	20–25	19–25			56–75	P2

==== 13th place match ====
Date	Time		Score		Set 1	Set 2	Set 3	Set 4	Set 5	Total	Report
31 Jul	14:00	Sri Lanka	1–3	Iraq	25–16	11–25	22–25	21–25		79–91	P2

=== 9th–12th places ===
9th–12th semifinals
30 July
Qatar	3
Pakistan	2
30 July
Thailand	2
Vietnam	3

9th place match
31 July
Qatar	3
Vietnam	1
11th place match
31 July
Pakistan	1
Thailand	3

==== 9th–12th semifinals ====
Date	Time		Score		Set 1	Set 2	Set 3	Set 4	Set 5	Total	Report
30 Jul	16:30	Qatar	3–2	Pakistan	25–19	20–25	17–25	25–18	15–12	102–99	P2
30 Jul	19:10	Thailand	2–3	Vietnam	19–25	16–25	25–21	25–16	10–15	95–102	P2

==== 11th place match ====
Date	Time		Score		Set 1	Set 2	Set 3	Set 4	Set 5	Total	Report
31 Jul	16:30	Pakistan	1–3	Thailand	23–25	25–18	18–25	18–25		84–93	P2

==== 9th place match ====
Date	Time		Score		Set 1	Set 2	Set 3	Set 4	Set 5	Total	Report
31 Jul	18:45	Qatar	3–1	Vietnam	25–18	25–22	16–25	25–15		91–80	P2

=== Final eight ===
Quarterfinals
30 July
South Korea	3
China	0
30 July
Chinese Taipei	0
Kazakhstan	3
30 July
Iran	2
Indonesia	3
30 July
Japan	3
Australia	0

Semifinals
31 July
South Korea	2
Kazakhstan	3
31 July
Indonesia	0
Japan	3

Final
1 August
Kazakhstan	1
Japan	3
3rd place match
1 August
South Korea	3
Indonesia	0

5th–8th semifinals
31 July
China	3
Chinese Taipei	0
31 July
Iran	3
Australia	2

5th place match
1 August
China	1
Iran	3
7th place match
1 August
Chinese Taipei	3
Australia	2

==== Quarterfinals ====
Date	Time		Score		Set 1	Set 2	Set 3	Set 4	Set 5	Total	Report
30 Jul	11:30	Chinese Taipei	0–3	Kazakhstan	22–25	22–25	23–25			67–75	P2
30 Jul	14:00	Japan	3–0	Australia	25–21	25–16	25–22			75–59	P2
30 Jul	16:30	South Korea	3–0	China	25–18	25–19	25–23			75–60	P2
30 Jul	19:00	Iran	2–3	Indonesia	25–18	25–18	23–25	24–26	11–15	108–102	P2

==== 5th–8th semifinals ====
Date	Time		Score		Set 1	Set 2	Set 3	Set 4	Set 5	Total	Report
31 Jul	11:30	China	3–0	Chinese Taipei	25–22	25–19	25–23			75–64	P2
31 Jul	14:00	Iran	3–2	Australia	17–25	18–25	25–21	25–19	16–14	101–104	P2

==== Semifinals ====
Date	Time		Score		Set 1	Set 2	Set 3	Set 4	Set 5	Total	Report
31 Jul	16:40	South Korea	2–3	Kazakhstan	25–20	25–15	17–25	23–25	14–16	104–101	P2
31 Jul	19:30	Indonesia	0–3	Japan	17–25	24–26	23–25			64–76	P2

==== 7th place match ====
Date	Time		Score		Set 1	Set 2	Set 3	Set 4	Set 5	Total	Report
1 Aug	11:30	Chinese Taipei	3–2	Australia	25–23	25–20	21–25	23–25	15–11	109–104	P2

==== 5th place match ====
Date	Time		Score		Set 1	Set 2	Set 3	Set 4	Set 5	Total	Report
1 Aug	14:00	China	1–3	Iran	25–15	17–25	23–25	21–25		86–90	P2

==== 3rd place match ====
Date	Time		Score		Set 1	Set 2	Set 3	Set 4	Set 5	Total	Report
1 Aug	16:30	South Korea	3–0	Indonesia	25–16	25–21	25–13			75–50	P2

==== Final ====
Date	Time		Score		Set 1	Set 2	Set 3	Set 4	Set 5	Total	Report
1 Aug	19:00	Kazakhstan	1–3	Japan	13–25	20–25	27–25	23–25		83–100	P2

== Final standing ==
Rank	Team
1st place, gold medalist(s)	Japan
2nd place, silver medalist(s)	Kazakhstan
3rd place, bronze medalist(s)	South Korea
4	Indonesia
5	Iran
6	China
7	Chinese Taipei
8	Australia
9	Qatar
10	Vietnam
11	Thailand
12	Pakistan
13	Iraq
14	Sri Lanka
15	Saudi Arabia
16	Hong Kong

2017 Asian Men's champions

Japan
9th title

14–man roster
Otake, Hideomi Fukatsu (c), Naonobu Fujii, Yuta Yoneyama, Akihiro Yamauchi, Takashi Dekita, Masahiro Yanagida, Satoshi Ide, Shuzo Yamada, Yūki Ishikawa, Haku Ri, Kentaro Takahashi, Hiroaki Asano, Taichiro Koga
Head coach
Yuichi Nakagaichi

== Awards ==
- Most valuable player
  (Japan) Yūki Ishikawa
- Best setter
  (Japan) Naonobu Fujii
- Best outside spikers
  (Japan) Yūki Ishikawa
  (Kazakhstan) Vitaliy Vorivodin
- Best middle blockers
  (Kazakhstan) Nodirkhan Kadirkhanov
  (Japan) Haku Ri
- Best opposite spiker
  (Indonesia) Rivan Nurmulki
- Best libero
  (South Korea) Oh Jae-seong

== See also ==
- 2017 Asian Women's Volleyball Championship
