= Toray Arrows =

Toray Arrows may refer to:

- Toray Arrows (men's volleyball team)
- Toray Arrows (women's volleyball team)
