= Yūki Ishikawa =

Japanese volleyball player (born 1995)

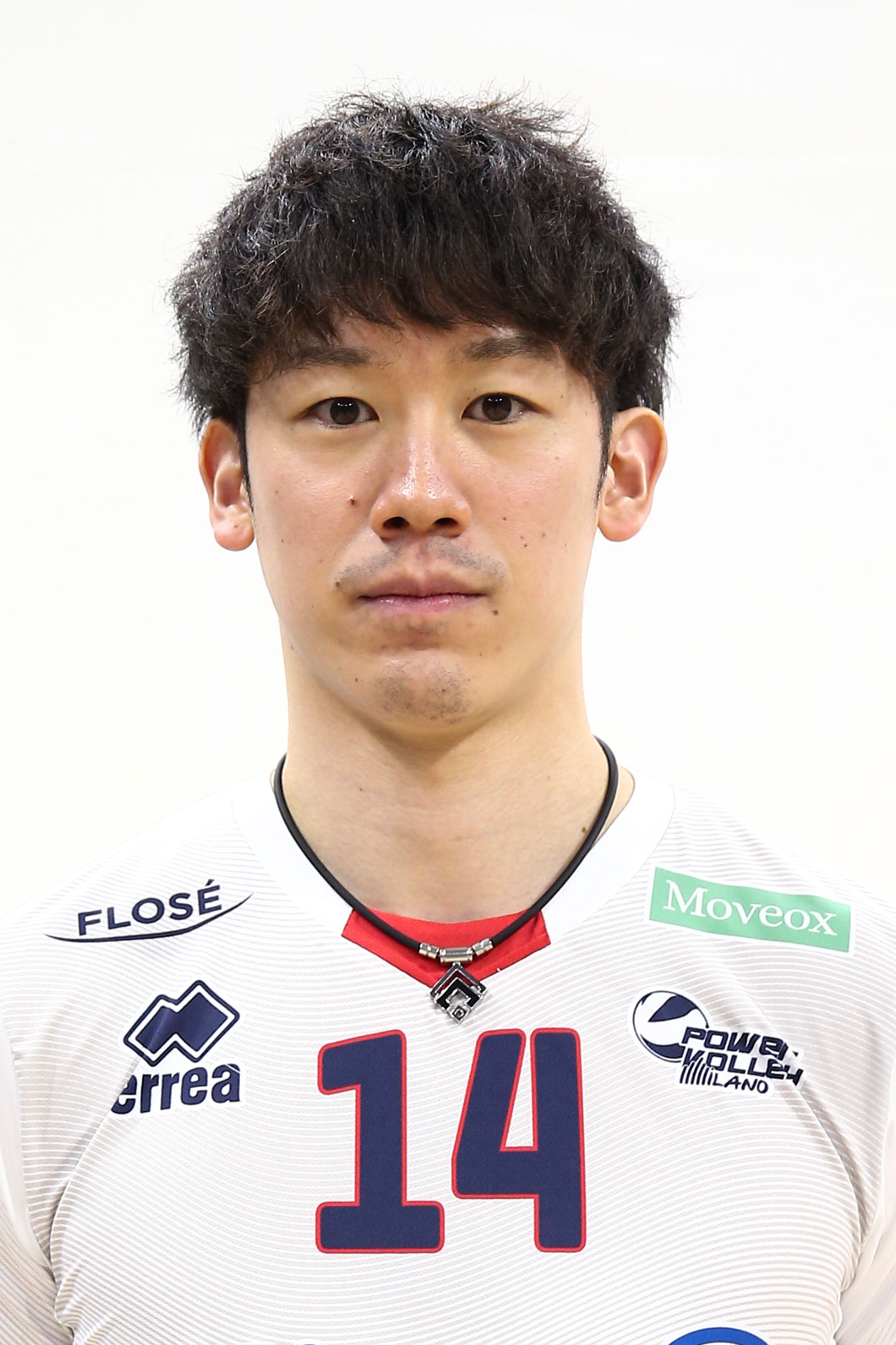

Personal information
- Full name: Yūki Ishikawa
- Nationality: (Japan) Japanese
- Born: 11 December 1995 (age 30) Okazaki, Aichi, Japan
- Education: Chuo University
- Height: 1.92 m (6 ft 4 in)
- Weight: 84 kg (185 lb)
- Spike: 351 cm (138 in)
- Block: 327 cm (129 in)

Volleyball information
- Position: Outside hitter
- Current club: (Turkey) Ziraat Bankkart
- Number: 14

Career
- Years: Team
- 2005–2008: (Japan) Yahagi Minami Elementary School
- 2008–2011: (Japan) Yahagi Junior High School
- 2011–2014: (Japan) Seijoh High School
- 2014–2017: (Japan) Chuo University
- 2014–2015: (Italy) Parmareggio Modena
- 2016–2018: (Italy) Top Volley Latina
- 2018–2019: (Italy) Emma Villas Siena
- 2019–2020: (Italy) Kioene Padova
- 2020–2024: (Italy) Allianz Milano
- 2024–2026: (Italy) Sir Susa Vim Perugia
- 2026–: (Turkey) Ziraat Bankkart

National team
- Years: Team
- 2012–2013: Japan under-19 national team
- 2013–2014: Japan under-21 national team
- 2014–: Japan senior national team
Medal record
Men's volleyball
Representing Japan
FIVB Nations League
Silver medal – second place	2024 Łódź	Team
Bronze medal – third place	2023 Gdańsk	Team
Asian Games
Silver medal – second place	2014 Incheon	Team
Asian Championship
Gold medal – first place	2017 Gresik	Team
Gold medal – first place	2023 Urmia	Team
Gold medal – first place	2026 Fukuoka	Team
Silver medal – second place	2021 Chiba/Funabashi	Team
Bronze medal – third place	2019 Tehran	Team
Asian Cup
Bronze medal – third place	2016 Nakhon Pathom	Team
Asian Youth Championship
Bronze medal – third place	2012 Tehran	Team

Yūki Ishikawa (石川祐希, Ishikawa Yūki; born 11 December 1995) is a Japanese professional volleyball player who plays as an outside hitter for Efeler Ligi club Ziraat Bankkart and the Japan national team, which he captains.

Ishikawa is the first volleyball player to have a wax figure in Japan. His wax figure is currently on display at Madame Tussauds Tokyo. He is also the first Japanese male player to win 2 gold medals at the CEV Champions League (2024–2025, 2025–2026) and 1 gold medal the FIVB Club World Championship (2025).

Ishikawa was named as the "Best outside spiker" at the FIVB World Cup (2015, 2019), FIVB Nations League (2023, 2024), Asian Championship (2017, 2019, 2021), as well as the "Most valuable player" at the Asian Championship (2017, 2023).

He is Powervolley Milano's all-time top scorer, with 1837 points for the club to his name.

== Personal life ==
Ishikawa is from Okazaki City, Aichi Prefecture. His father, Mikihisa, is a former track and field sprinter. His mother, Midori, is a former basketball player. His elder sister, Naomi, is a former volleyball player and his sister, Mayu, is a member and also the captain of the Japan women's national volleyball team.

== Career ==
=== Clubs ===
Due to the influence of his elder sister, Ishikawa started playing volleyball in 4th grade of Elementary School. His best achievement was the top 8 at the All Japan Volleyball Elementary School Tournament when he was in 6th grade. In 2010, he won the bronze medal at the All Japan Junior High School Volleyball Championship. Then, he was selected as a captain of Aichi Prefecture, and won the silver medal at the JOC Junior Olympic Cup the same year. In High School, he became the first student to win "Triple Crown" at 3 tournaments: Inter-High, National Polity, Haruko Volley for 2 consecutive years.

In the 2014–2015 season, Ishikawa played for the Italian team Parmareggio Modena about 3 months after the end of the All Japan Intercollegiate Volleyball Championship. According to an official of the Japan Association, he was the first student to challenge an overseas league through university, and was also the first university freshman to play volleyball in the SuperLega. In the 2015–2016 season, he returned to Japan to continue playing for Chuo University's club. In December 2016, he transferred to Italy again, played for Top Volley Latina until 2018. During this time, he was an exchange student while actually still playing for his university.

After graduating from university in March 2018, Ishikawa signed his first professional contract with the Italian team Emma Villas Siena (The club was ranked up to the SuperLega in the 2018–2019 season). He moved to Kioene Padova in the next season. He changed club again in 2020, to Allianz Milano. Then, he extended his contract in the 2021–2022 season, continued to stay with the club for the 2022–2023 season, and re-signed for the fourth time for the next season. In the 10th and 11th seasons, he joined Sir Susa Vim Perugia.

In the 2024–2025 season, Ishikawa and Perugia won the first title at the CEV Champions League.

After 11 seasons playing volleyball in Italy, Ishikawa moved to Turkey and signed with Ziraat Bankkart.

=== National team ===
In 2012, Ishikawa was called for the Japan men's national under-19 volleyball team for the first time, and the Japanese team won the bronze medal at the 2012 Asian Youth Boys Volleyball Championship in Tehran, Iran. He also won the "Best scorer" award at the end of the tournament.

In 2013, as the national team representative, Ishikawa competed in the 2013 FIVB Volleyball Boys' U19 World Championship in Mexico, where the Japanese team finished in 17th place. He continued to compete in the 2013 FIVB Volleyball Men's U21 World Championship in Turkey the same year, where the Japanese team finished in 10th place.

In April 2014, Ishikawa entered Chuo University (Faculty of Law, Department of Political Science), and was called for the Japan men's national volleyball team for the first time. In September 2014, his debut competition was at the 2014 Asian Games in Incheon, South Korea. The Japanese team won the silver medal after losing to the Iran team with a score of 1–3 in the final. In October 2014, he was part of the Japanese roster for the 2014 Asian Men's U20 Volleyball Championship in Manama, Bahrain, and led the team to finish in 5th place.

In September 2015, Ishikawa participated in the 2015 FIVB Volleyball Men's World Cup in Japan for the first time. The Japanese team finished in 6th place but he still won the "Best outside spiker" award of the FIVB's tournament as a member of the senior national team.

In July 2017, Ishikawa participated in the 2017 Asian Men's Volleyball Championship in Gresik, Indonesia for the first time because he was not called to the tournament in 2015. The Japanese team won the gold medal, and he also won the "Most valuable player, Best Outside Spiker" double award of the AVC's tournament as a member of the senior national team.

In 2021, Ishikawa became the captain of the Japan men's national volleyball team, and was assigned to lead the team at the 2020 Summer Olympics in Tokyo, Japan. The Japanese team finished in 7th place after losing to the Brazil team with a score of 0–3 in the quarterfinals. In September 2021, he led the team to win the silver medal at the 2021 Asian Men's Volleyball Championship, and won the "Best outside spiker" award as a captain of the senior national team.

In July 2023, Ishikawa and the Japanese team won bronze medal at the 2023 FIVB Men's Volleyball Nations League after defeating the Italy team with a score of 3–2 in the 3rd place match. He also won the "Best outside spiker" award as a captain of the senior national team. In August 2023, he led the team to win the 10th gold medal at the 2023 Asian Men's Volleyball Championship, and won the "Most Valuable Player" award as a captain of the senior national team.

== Special teams ==
- Ishikawa was selected as a member of "Team CORE" of『Project CORE』in June 2014.

『Project CORE』was a project launched by the JVA with the aimed to "revitalize volleyball, deliver courage and excitement" to the people of Japan toward 2020 as well as the future beyond.

- Ishikawa was selected as a member of「TEAM JAPAN symbol athletes」in June 2022.

「TEAM JAPAN symbol athletes」are athletes the representative of TEAM JAPAN and certified by the JOC as the symbol of "athletes that everyone admires". Their mission is to actively cooperates with the JOC's Olympic Movement promotion projects and marketing activities, and plays a role in conveying the value of sports to society.

== Commercial value ==
- Ishikawa signed an advisory contract with the Japanese sportswear brand『DESCENTE』and『SKINS』of Descente Ltd. in April 2018. Then, he signed another an advisory contract with the brand『MOVESPORT』of the company in September 2024.
- Ishikawa signed a support contract for the amino acid brand「VAAM」of Meiji Co., Ltd. in September 2018.
- According to an Italian sports newspaper published in 2022, the President of Allianz Milano, Lucio Fusaro revealed that more than 60 season tickets were purchased from Ishikawa's fans in Japan and Thailand to support the team despite the fact that they could not go to Italy to watch the games live.
- Ishikawa signed an advisory contract with the Japanese necklace brand「Colantotte」in October 2022.
- Ishikawa signed an ambassador contract with the Italian medical bedding brand「Fabe」in July 2023.
- Ishikawa appointed as「Tod's」Brand Friend of the Italian luxury fashion house in July 2024.
- Ishikawa signed a partnership contract with the Japanese beauty brand「POLA」in August 2024.
- Ishikawa and his sister appointed as new ambassadors for the「Italian Pavilion」in June 2025.
- Ishikawa entered into partnership agreement with the Japanese sports supplement brand「DNS」in July 2025.
- Ishikawa appointed as brand advisor for Italian’s『Maniflex』in October 2025.

== Physical condition ==
=== Injuries ===
- In 2011, Ishikawa had abdominal muscle strain after the quarterfinals of the National High School Comprehensive Athletic Meet Volleyball Tournament.
- In March 2016, Ishikawa had inflammation in his left knee at the training camp, where the 2016 Summer Olympics were to be played. In June 2016, he twisted his right ankle at the 1st World Olympic Qualification Tournament while playing against the Australia team.
- In September 2017, Ishikawa injured his right knee ligament at the 2017 FIVB Volleyball Men's World Grand Champions Cup while playing against the France team.
- In September 2021, Ishikawa had a backache and lower back pain before participating in the 2021 Asian Men's Volleyball Championship.
- In July 2022, Ishikawa sprained his left ankle during practice for the quarterfinals of the 2022 FIVB Men's Volleyball Nations League.
- In January 2025, Ishikawa suffered a minor muscle cramps while playing against Itas Trentino team.
- In December 2025, Ishikawa suffered a minor muscle strain in his left knee during training at the club.
- In February 2026, Ishikawa sprained the inner part of his right knee while playing against Sonepar Padova team.

=== COVID-19 ===
In December 2020, Ishikawa was positive for COVID-19 when he was playing volleyball in Italy. He recovered after nearly 20 days of home treatment. However, his taste and smell were still experiencing abnormal symptoms.

== Individual awards ==
=== Tournaments ===
==== Student level ====
- 2010 All Japan Junior High School Volleyball Championship – Excellent Player Award
- 2010 JOC Junior Olympic Cup – Excellent Player Award
- 2011 National High School Comprehensive Athletic Meet Volleyball Tournament – Excellent Player Award
- 2012 National High School Comprehensive Athletic Meet Volleyball Tournament – Best 6 Award
- 2012 National High School Comprehensive Athletic Meet Volleyball Tournament – Excellent Player Award
- 2013 All Japan Volleyball High School Championship – Excellent Player Award
- 2013 All Japan Volleyball High School Championship – Most valuable player
- 2013 National High School Comprehensive Athletic Meet Volleyball Tournament – Best 6 Award
- 2013 National High School Comprehensive Athletic Meet Volleyball Tournament – Excellent Player Award
- 2014 All Japan Volleyball High School Championship – Excellent Player Award
- 2014 All Japan Volleyball High School Championship – Most valuable player
- 2014 Spring Kanto University Volleyball League – Serve Award
- 2014 Spring Kanto University Volleyball League – New Face Award
- 2014 Spring Kanto University Volleyball League – Chairman's Special Award
- 2014 All Japan Intercollegiate Volleyball Championship – Serve Award
- 2014 All Japan Intercollegiate Volleyball Championship – Most valuable player
- 2015 Kurowashiki All Japan Volleyball Tournament – Young Eagle Award (Best Newcomer Award)
- 2015 Spring Kanto University Volleyball League – Serve Award
- 2015 Spring Kanto University Volleyball League – Spike Award
- 2015 Spring Kanto University Volleyball League – Chairman's Special Award
- 2015 All Japan Intercollegiate Volleyball Championship – MIP Award
- 2015 All Japan Intercollegiate Volleyball Championship – Best scorer
- 2016 Autumn Kanto University Volleyball League – Spike Award
- 2016 Autumn Kanto University Volleyball League – Serve Award
- 2016 Autumn Kanto University Volleyball League – Chairman's Special Award
- 2016 All Japan Intercollegiate Volleyball Championship – MIP Award
- 2016 All Japan Intercollegiate Volleyball Championship – Best scorer
- 2016 All Japan Intercollegiate Volleyball Championship – Serve Award
- 2017 All Japan Intercollegiate Volleyball Championship – Best scorer
- 2017 All Japan Intercollegiate Volleyball Championship – Spike Award

==== Athlete level ====
- 2012 Asian Youth Boys Volleyball Championship – Best scorer
- 2015 Memorial of Hubert Jerzy Wagner – Best receiver
- 2015 FIVB Volleyball Men's World Cup – Best outside spiker
- 2016 1st World Olympic Qualification Tournament – Best outside spiker
- 2017 Asian Men's Volleyball Championship – Most valuable player
- 2017 Asian Men's Volleyball Championship – Best outside spiker
- 2019 Asian Men's Volleyball Championship – Best outside spiker
- 2019 FIVB Volleyball Men's World Cup – Best outside spiker
- 2021 Asian Men's Volleyball Championship – Best outside spiker
- 2023 FIVB Men's Volleyball Nations League – Best outside spiker
- 2023 Asian Men's Volleyball Championship – Most valuable player
- 2024 FIVB Men's Volleyball Nations League – Best outside spiker
- 2024 Italian Super Cup – Most valuable player

=== Provincial ===
- 2021 Aichi Sports Achievement Award
- 2024 Aichi Sports Achievement Award

=== University ===
- 2014–2015 61st Student Athletic Association Award【Excellent Player Award】
- 2014–2015 61st Student Athletic Association Award【University President's Award】
- 2014–2015 32nd Chuo University President's Award【Field of sports (individual)】
- 2015–2016 62nd Student Athletic Association Award【Excellent Player Award】
- 2015–2016 62nd Student Athletic Association Award【University President's Award】
- 2015–2016 33rd Chuo University President's Award【Field of sports (individual)】
- 2017–2018 64th Student Athletic Association Award【Special Award】
- 2017–2018 64th Student Athletic Association Award【University President's Award・Special Award】
- 2017–2018 35th Chuo University President's Award【Field of sports (individual)】
- 2021–2022 39th Chuo University President's Award【Field of sports (OB, OG)】

=== Other ===
- anan Award 2023 – Athlete division
- GQ Men of the Year 2024 – Best Team Award

== National honours ==
=== Trophies & medals ===
- 2012 Asian Youth Boys Volleyball Championship 3rd place
- 2014 Asian Games Runner-up
- 2015 Memorial of Hubert Jerzy Wagner Runner-up
- 2016 Asian Men's Volleyball Cup 3rd place
- 2017 Asian Men's Volleyball Championship Champion
- 2019 Asian Men's Volleyball Championship 3rd place
- 2021 Asian Men's Volleyball Championship Runner-up
- 2023 FIVB Men's Volleyball Nations League 3rd place
- 2023 Asian Men's Volleyball Championship Champion
- 2024 FIVB Men's Volleyball Nations League Runner-up
- 2026 AVC Men's Volleyball Continental Championship Champion

=== Awards ===
- 2021–2022 70th Japan Sports Award「Best Award by Competition Group」
- 2023–2024 57th TV Asahi Big Sports Award「Big Sports Special Contribution Award」
- 2023–2024 72nd Japan Sports Award「Best Award by Competition Group」
- 2023–2024 JOC Sports Award – Annual Award「Special Achievement Award」
- 2024 Olympic and Paralympic Games Outstanding Achievement Award
- 2024 Sports Merit Award
- 2024–2025 73rd Japan Sports Award「Best Award by Competition Group」

== Clubs achievements ==
=== Junior ===
==== Trophies & medals ====
- 2010 All Japan Junior High School Volleyball Championship 3rd place
- 2010 National Prefectural Competition Junior High School Volleyball Tournament (JOC Junior Olympic Cup) Runner-up
- 2011 National High School Comprehensive Athletic Meet Volleyball Tournament (Inter-High) 3rd place
- 2012 Tokai High School Volleyball Championship Champion
- 2012 ZAMST Cup Sakai Blazers West Japan High School Volleyball Tournament Champion
- 2012 Tokai High School Volleyball Championship Champion
- 2012 Chubu Comprehensive Volleyball Championship Champion
- 2012 National High School Comprehensive Athletic Meet Volleyball Tournament (Inter-High) Champion
- 2012 National Sports Festival Volleyball Competition (National Polity) Champion
- 2013 All Japan Volleyball High School Championship (Haruko Volley) Champion
- 2013 Tokai High School Volleyball Championship Champion
- 2013 National Private High School Boys and Girls Volleyball Championship Champion
- 2013 Tokai High School Volleyball Championship Champion
- 2013 Central Japan 6-player Volleyball Championship Champion
- 2013 National High School Comprehensive Athletic Meet Volleyball Tournament (Inter-High) Champion
- 2013 National Sports Festival Volleyball Competition (National Polity) Champion
- 2014 All Japan Volleyball High School Championship (Haruko Volley) Champion
- 2014 Spring Kanto University Volleyball League Champion
- 2014 All Japan Intercollegiate Volleyball Championship Champion
- 2015 Spring Kanto University Volleyball League Champion
- 2015 Autumn Kanto University Volleyball League Champion
- 2015 All Japan Intercollegiate Volleyball Championship Champion
- 2016 Autumn Kanto University Volleyball League Champion
- 2016 All Japan Intercollegiate Volleyball Championship Champion
- 2017 Spring Kanto University Volleyball League Runner-up
- 2017 All Japan Intercollegiate Volleyball Championship 3rd place

==== Awards ====
- 2013 Alumni Club Activity Encouragement Award
- 2013 Toyoake City Sports Award
- 2014 Alumni Club Activity Encouragement Award
- 2014 Toyoake City Sports Award
- 2014–2015 61st Student Athletic Association Award【Excellent Group Award】
- 2014–2015 32nd Chuo University President's Award【Field of sports (group)】
- 2015–2016 29th Shibuya Kenichi Encouragement Award【Physical education field】
- 2015–2016 62nd Student Athletic Association Award【Excellent Group Award】
- 2015–2016 33rd Chuo University President's Award【Field of sports (group)】
- 2016–2017 63rd Student Athletic Association Award【Excellent Group Award】
- 2016–2017 34th Chuo University President's Award【Field of sports (group)】
- 2017–2018 64th Student Athletic Association Award【Effort Group Award】 – The only award of club that Ishikawa didn't contribute gold medals.

=== Senior ===
==== Italian ====
- 2014–2015 Italian Cup Champion, with Parmareggio Modena
- 2023–2024 Italian Championship 3rd place, with Allianz Milano
- 2024 Italian Super Cup Champion, with Sir Susa Vim Perugia
- 2024–2025 Italian Championship 3rd place, with Sir Susa Vim Perugia
- 2025 Italian Super Cup Champion, with Sir Susa Scai Perugia
- 2025–2026 Italian Championship Champion, with Sir Susa Scai Perugia

==== CEV ====
- 2020–2021 CEV Challenge Cup Champion, with Allianz Powervolley Milano
- 2024–2025 CEV Champions League Champion, with Sir Sicoma Monini Perugia
- 2025–2026 CEV Champions League Champion, with Sir Sicoma Monini Perugia

==== FIVB ====
- 2025 FIVB Volleyball Men's Club World Championship Champion, with Sir Sicoma Monini Perugia

==== Other ====
- 2018 Memorial Valter Baldaccini Runner-up, with Emma Villas Siena
- 2018 Memorial Parenti Champion, with Emma Villas Siena
- 2022 Trofeo Astori 3rd place, with Allianz Milano
- 2023 Jesi Volley Cup 3rd place, with Allianz Milano
- 2024 Bogdanka Volley Cup Champion, with Sir Susa Vim Perugia
- 2024 Jesi Volley Cup Champion, with Sir Susa Vim Perugia

== Summarizing data ==
=== SuperLega ===
Seasons	Clubs	Matches		Sets		Attack				Block		Serve				Reception				Score			MVP		
Seasons	Clubs	Tot	Pld	Tot	Pld	Tot	Err	Pts	%Succ	Pts	Avg	Tot	Err	Ace	Avg	Tot	Err	Exc	%Exc	Tot	Rank		Tot	Rank	
Seasons	Clubs	Tot	Pld	Tot	Pld	Tot	Err	Pts	%Succ	Pts	Avg	Tot	Err	Ace	Avg	Tot	Err	Exc	%Exc	Tot	T	S	Tot	T	S
14-15	Parmareggio Modena	35	10	126	16	39	3	25	64,1	1	0,06	29	8	3	0,19	44	2	12	27,3	29	9	112	0	–	–
16-17	Top Volley Latina	32	13	127	45	149	8	75	50,3	6	0,13	111	19	9	0,2	205	19	57	27,8	90	7	99	0	–	–
17-18	Taiwan Excellence Latina	33	23	127	71	340	24	184	54,1	17	0,24	221	64	17	0,24	351	37	95	27,1	218	4	57	3	1	27
18-19	Emma Villas Siena	26	26	113	111	668	42	310	46,4	37	0,33	398	89	29	0,26	666	74	159	23,9	376	2	21	0	–	–
19-20	Kioene Padova	20	20	76	74	423	30	206	48,7	16	0,22	309	69	30	0,41	422	50	93	22	252	2	23	3	1	14
20-21	Allianz Milano	41	37	162	139	871	61	403	46,3	39	0,28	498	115	28	0,2	641	52	169	26,4	470	1	9	6	1	5
21-22	Allianz Milano	33	32	128	124	772	53	319	41,3	27	0,22	463	102	24	0,19	776	66	192	24,7	370	3	23	2	3	28
22-23	Allianz Milano	37	35	142	131	895	50	419	46,8	30	0,23	497	126	37	0,28	697	44	168	24,1	486	2	9	3	2	19
23-24	Allianz Milano	37	35	152	141	919	51	436	47,4	27	0,19	506	126	48	0,34	600	49	128	21,3	511	1	7	4	1	14
24-25	Sir Susa Vim Perugia	36	34	143	101	534	40	275	51,5	16	0,16	291	66	24	0,24	371	42	74	19,9	315	4	25	7	2	4
25-26	Sir Susa Scai Perugia	35	16	131	43	197	16	98	49,7	2	0,05	117	26	5	0,12	177	17	25	14,1	105	8	68	0	–	–

=== CEV ===
Seasons	Tournaments	Clubs	Matches		Sets		Attack				Block		Serve				Reception				Score			MVP
Seasons	Tournaments	Clubs	Tot	Pld	Tot	Pld	Tot	Err	Pts	%Succ	Pts	Avg	Tot	Err	Ace	Avg	Tot	Err	Exc	%Exc	Tot	Rank		MVP
Seasons	Tournaments	Clubs	Tot	Pld	Tot	Pld	Tot	Err	Pts	%Succ	Pts	Avg	Tot	Err	Ace	Avg	Tot	Err	Exc	%Exc	Tot	T	S	MVP
20-21	CEV Challenge Cup	Allianz Powervolley Milano	6	4	23	16	82	6	41	50	2	0,12	45	14	1	0,06	96	10	18	18,7	44	5	19	0
23-24	CEV Cup	Allianz Milano	6	4	21	13	41	2	24	58,5	1	0,08	40	4	1	0,08	48	13	5	10,4	26	7	118	0
24-25	CEV Champions League	Sir Sicoma Monini Perugia	10	9	36	32	227	16	129	56,8	4	0,12	131	24	6	0,19	170	28	36	21,2	139	1	10	0
25-26	CEV Champions League	Sir Sicoma Monini Perugia	10	5	36	15	78	7	32	41	1	0,07	27	9	1	0,07	54	3	8	14,8	34	8	123	0

=== FIVB ===
Season	Tournament	Club	Matches		Sets		Attack				Block		Serve				Reception				Score			MVP
Season	Tournament	Club	Tot	Pld	Tot	Pld	Tot	Err	Pts	%Succ	Pts	Avg	Tot	Err	Ace	Avg	Tot	Err	Exc	%Exc	Tot	Rank		MVP
Season	Tournament	Club	Tot	Pld	Tot	Pld	Tot	Err	Pts	%Succ	Pts	Avg	Tot	Err	Ace	Avg	Tot	Err	Exc	%Exc	Tot	T	S	MVP
2025	FIVB Club World Championship	Sir Sicoma Monini Perugia	5	2	17	4	9	2	4	44,44	2	0,4	3	0	0	0	2	0	1	50	6	8	35	0

Awards
Preceded by (India) Anup D'Costa	Best Scorer of Asian Youth Volleyball Championship; 2012	Succeeded by Awards
Preceded by (Russia) Aleksey Spiridonov	Best Receiver of Memorial of Hubert Jerzy Wagner; 2015	Succeeded by Awards
Preceded by Awards	Best Outside Spiker of FIVB Volleyball Men's World Cup; 2015 (ex aequo (Italy) Osmany Juantorena); 2019 (ex aequo (Poland) Wilfredo León)	Succeeded by Results
Preceded by (Japan) Kunihiro Shimizu (Iran) Saber Kazemi	Most Valuable Player of Asian Men's Volleyball Championship; 2017; 2023	Succeeded by (Australia) Thomas Edgar
Preceded by (Iran) Purya Fayazi (Iran) Hamzeh Zarini	Best Outside Spiker of Asian Men's Volleyball Championship; 2017 (ex aequo (Kazakhstan) Vitaliy Vorivodin); 2019 (ex aequo (Australia) Samuel Walker); 2021 (ex aequo (Iran) Milad Ebadipour)	Succeeded by (Japan) Ran Takahashi (Qatar) Raimi Wadidie
Preceded by (France) Trévor Clévenot (France) Earvin N'Gapeth	Best Outside Spiker of FIVB Men's Volleyball Nations League; 2023 (ex aequo (Poland) Aleksander Śliwka); 2024 (ex aequo (Poland) Tomasz Fornal)	Succeeded by (Poland) Wilfredo León (Italy) Alessandro Michieletto
Preceded by (Tunisia) Wassim Ben Tara	Most Valuable Player of Italian Super Cup; 2024	Succeeded by (Italy) Simone Giannelli
