= Miya Sato (volleyball, born 1990) =

Japanese volleyball player (born 1990)

Miya Fujii
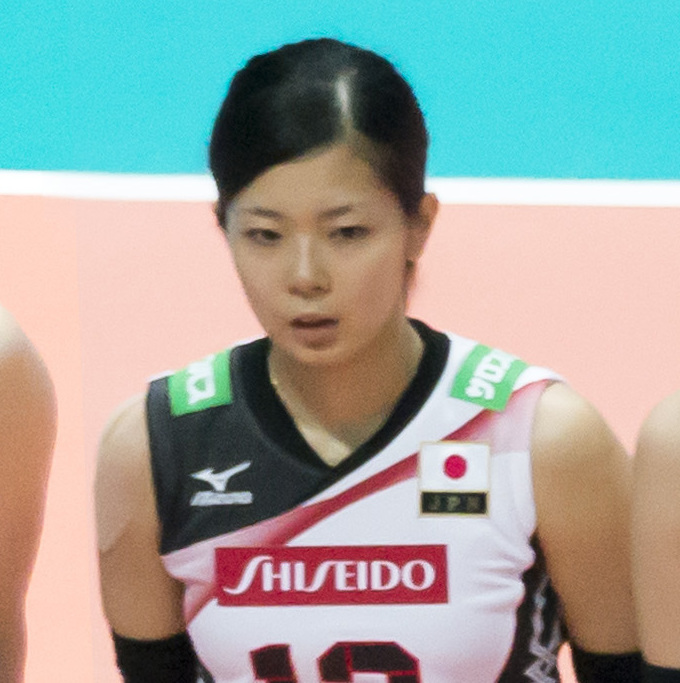

Personal information
- Nationality: Japanese
- Born: Miya Sato; 7 March 1990 (age 36); Tsuchizaki-Minato, Akita, Japan
- Height: 175 cm (69 in)
- Weight: 62 kg (137 lb)
- Spike: 284 cm (112 in)
- Block: 280 cm (110 in)

Volleyball information
- Position: Setter
- Number: 12 (national team); 8 (club)

Career
Years	Teams
2018–2021	(Japan) Hitachi Rivale

National team
2018–2021	Japan

Miya Fujii (藤井 美弥, Fujii Miya; formerly Miya Sato (佐藤 美弥, Satō Miya), born 7 March 1990) is a retired Japanese female volleyball player. She announced her retirement from Hitachi Rivale club and the national team on 27 May 2021.

She was part of the Japan women's national volleyball team. She participated at the 2017 FIVB Volleyball Women's World Grand Champions Cup, and the 2018 FIVB Volleyball Women's Nations League.

== Personal life ==
On 26 September 2021, she announced her marriage. She married Naonobu Fujii, a setter of Toray Arrows and Japan men's national volleyball team who died on 10 March 2023 from stomach cancer.
