= J Sports =

Japanese sports TV channels

- Country: Japan

Programming
- Language: Japanese
- Picture format: 1080i HDTV

Ownership
- Owner: J Sports Corporation

History
- Launched: 1 April 1992 (J Sports 3); 25 April 1998 (J Sports 1, 2); 1 September 1998 (J Sports 4)
- Former names: J Sky Sports (1998–2003); Sports-i ESPN (1992–2006, J Sports 3)

Links
- Website: www.jsports.co.jp

J Sports Corporation

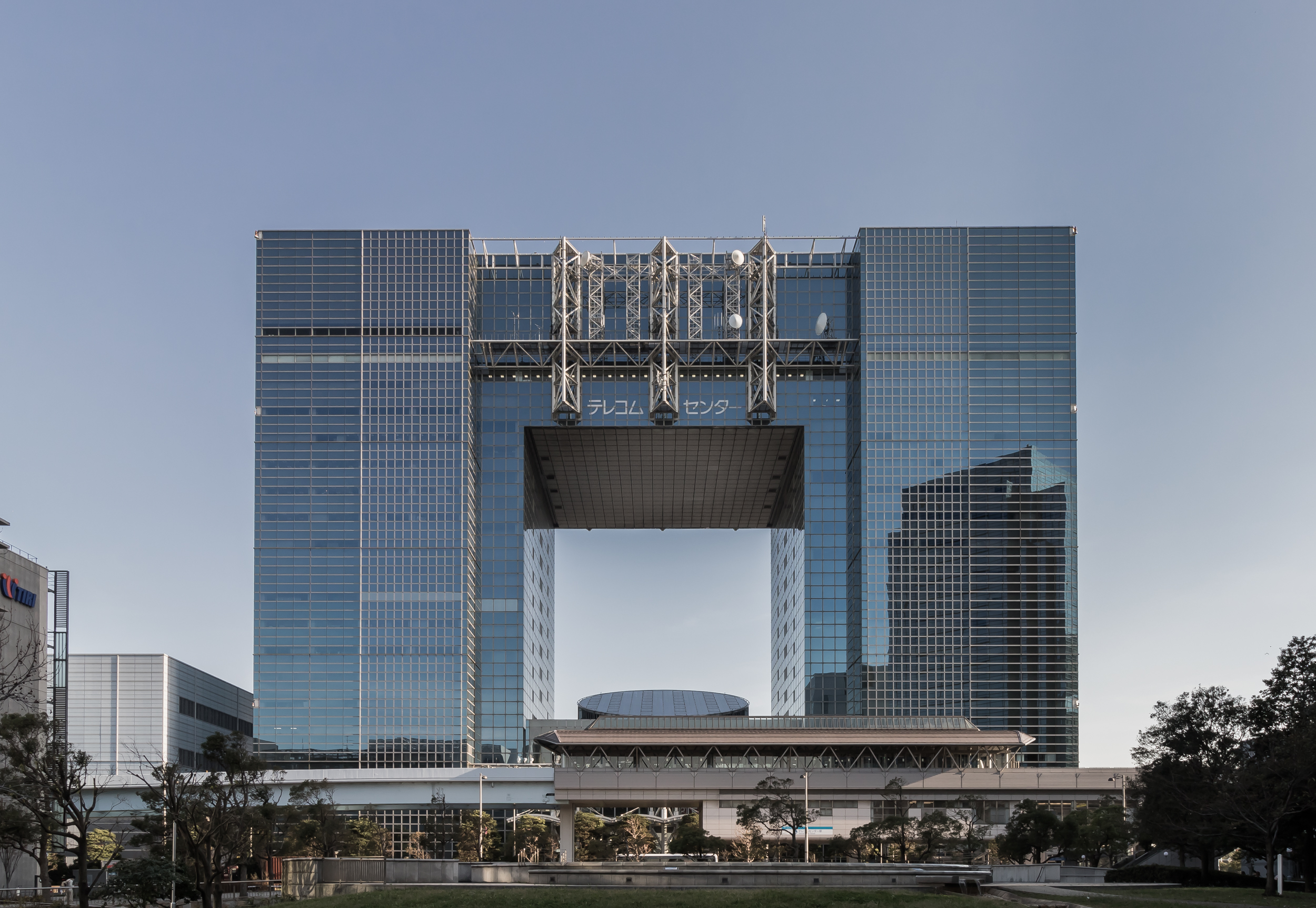
- Headquarters in Koto, Tokyo
- Type: Subsidiary
- Industry: cable television
- Founded: 5 September 1996; 30 years ago
- Headquarters: Telecom Center, Aomi, Koto, Tokyo, Japan
- Products: television programs
- Owner: J:COM (80.5%); SKY Perfect JSAT Corporation (15%); ESPN, LLC (3%); Tokyo Broadcasting System Holdings, Inc. (1.5%)
- Parent: J:COM

J Sports is a group of four sports satellite TV channels in Japan produced and broadcast by Jupiter Sports. They are owned by J Sports Corporation (株式会社ジェイ・スポーツ)

== Coverage ==
=== Football ===
==== Soccer ====
- FIFA
  - National teams
    - Men's:
      - FIFA U-17 World Cup
    - Women's :
      - FIFA Women's World Cup
      - FIFA U-20 Women's World Cup
- JFA
  - Japan women's national football team

=== Rugby union ===
- Japan Rugby League One
- Rugby World Cup
- Women's Rugby World Cup

=== Basketball ===
- NCAA Basketball
- All Japan Intercollegiate Basketball Championship
- National Basketball Association

=== Baseball ===
- World Baseball Classic
- Major League Baseball

=== Badminton ===
- BWF
  - BWF World Tour
  - World Championships
    - Teams
      - Thomas Cup (men's championship)
      - Uber Cup (women's championship)
      - Sudirman Cup (mixed team championship)
    - Individuals
- Badminton Asia Championships

=== Volleyball ===
- All Japan Intercollegiate Volleyball Championship

=== Ice hockey ===
- Asia League Ice Hockey
- National Hockey League

=== Table tennis ===
- ITTF Pro Tour

=== Cycling ===
- Tour de France
- Tour de Langkawi

=== Motorsports ===
- Deutsche Tourenwagen Masters
- FIA World Endurance Championship
- FIM Endurance World Championship
- Formula E
- Super Formula
- Super GT
- Superbike World Championship

== Programs ==
- J Sports Stadium (J SPORTS STADIUM 野球好き − Baseball games of the Chunichi Dragons, Orix Buffaloes, Hiroshima Toyo Carp and the Tohoku Rakuten Golden Eagles).
