= Haku Ri =

Japanese volleyball player (born 1990)

Haku Lee

Personal information
- Full name: Haku Lee
- Nickname: Lee
- Nationality: Japanese
- Born: 27 December 1990 (age 35); Miyazaki, Japan
- Hometown: Miyazaki, Japan
- Height: 1.94 m (6 ft 4 in)
- Weight: 83 kg (183 lb)
- Spike: 350 cm (138 in)
- Block: 325 cm (128 in)
- Education: University of Tsukuba

Volleyball information
- Position: Middle Blocker
- Current club: (Japan) Toray Arrows
- Number: 15

Career
Years	Teams
2009–2012; 2013–present	(Japan) University of Tsukuba (Japan) Toray Arrows

National team
2017–2022	Japan
Medal record
Men's volleyball
Representing Japan
Asian Championship
Gold medal – first place	2017 Gresik	Team
Silver medal – second place	2021 Chiba/Funabashi	Team
Bronze medal – third place	2019 Tehran	Team
Summer Universiade
Bronze medal – third place	2013 Kazan	Team
- Last updated: 19 September 2021

Haku Ri (李博, Ri Haku; born 27 December 1990), also known as Lee Haku, is a Japanese volleyball player, a member of the Japan men's national volleyball team and Toray Arrows in V.League division 1.

== Personal life ==
His parents both immigrated from China, before Haku Lee was born. His mother was on the national volleyball team of China and his father was also an athlete. He has one younger sister that is 14 years younger. Though his parents are Chinese, Lee has become a naturalized citizen of Japan and was born there.

== Career ==
Played Volleyball in high school from his mother's influence. Originally an ace wing spiker, he was changed to middle blocker in college. Lee played for the University of Tsukuba volleyball team until he graduated. After graduation he joined Toray Arrows

== Sporting achievements ==
=== Individually ===
- 2017 Asian Men's Volleyball Championship – Best Middle Blocker
