= Yohei Yamada =

Yohei Yamada is a Japanese-American commercial diver, boat captain and underwater recovery specialist based in Chicago known for retrieving lost property from Lake Michigan.

Born in Tokyo, Japan, he also lived in Switzerland, Singapore and Peoria, Illinois, moving with his family as they relocated for his father's work as an engineer for Caterpillar. He began swimming as a child and earned a swimming scholarship while attending the University of Illinois Chicago.

In July 2020, Yamada recovered the wedding ring of Chicago Cubs first baseman Anthony Rizzo after it fell into Belmont Harbor. The ring had sunk into approximately 21 feet of water and Yamada searched for about 90 minutes before locating it. According to Block Club Chicago, Yamada kept records of more than 500 objects recovered during a summer season, including phones, wallets, rings, keys, bicycles and watches. During winters, he reportedly captains a private boat in the Caribbean.

In 2026, Yamada recovered a photographer's wedding ring after it fell into the Lake during the 2026 Air and Water Show. The photographer, Mike Lang, had recorded his coordinates, and Yamada found the ring after multiple dives the next day according to NBC Chicago.
