= Osaka Sangyo University =

Higher education institution in Osaka Prefecture, Japan

Coordinates: 34°42′28.5″N 135°38′26.5″E

- 大阪産業大学
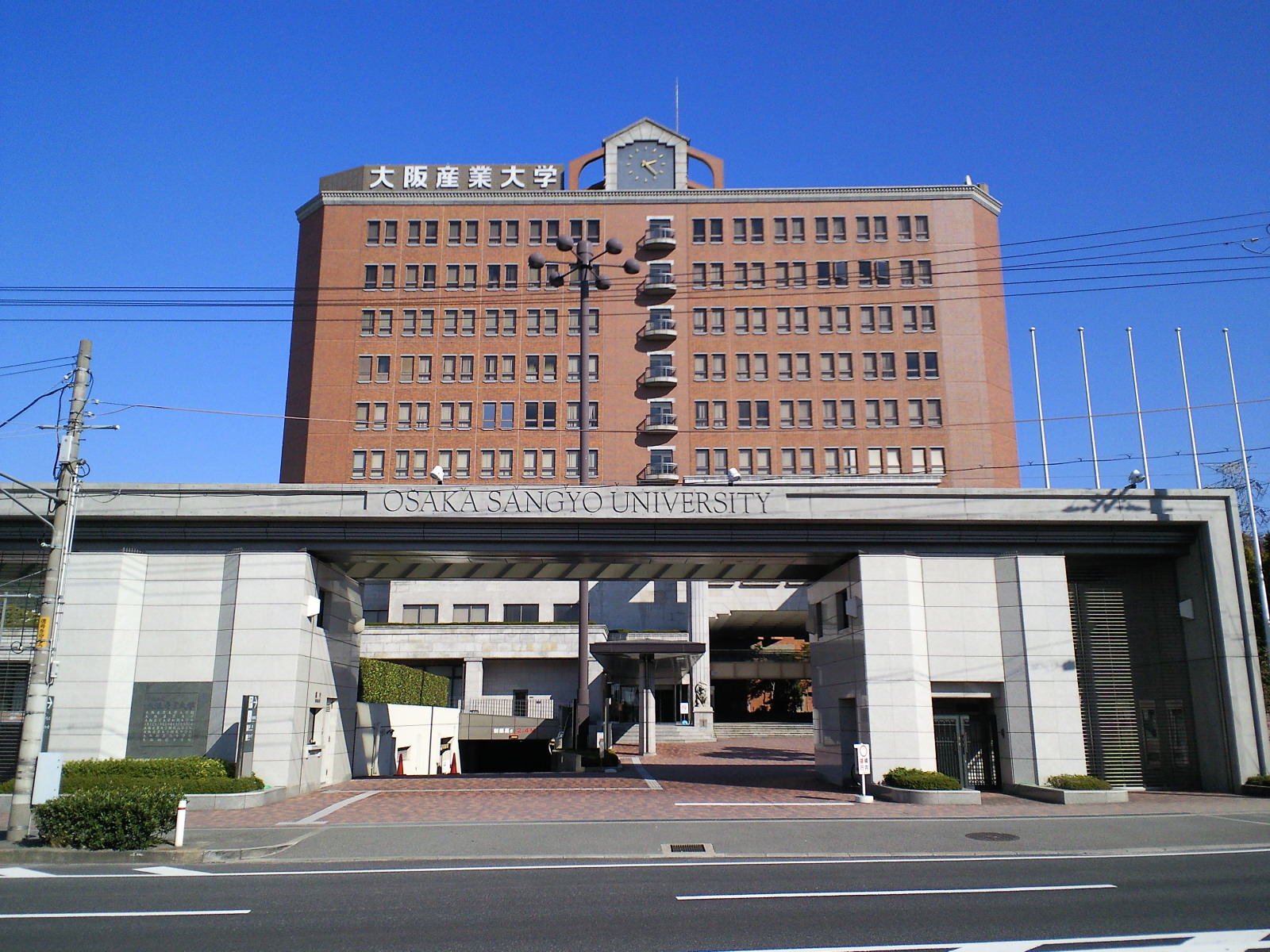
- Type: Private
- Established: 1928
- President: Yoshihiko Motoyama (本山美彦)
- Academic staff: 927
- Students: 10, 238
- Location: 3-1-1 Nakagaito, Daito City, Osaka, Japan, Osaka, Japan
- Campus: Urban
- Website: osaka-sandai.ac.jp

Osaka Sangyo University (大阪産業大学, Ōsaka sangyō daigaku) is a private university in Daitō, Osaka, Japan. It is abbreviated as "DaiSanDai" using the first characters of its name. It was established in 1923 as Osaka Railway School. The university has six faculties and four graduate schools. Its campuses are in the Nakagaito area of Daito City, Osaka close to the ancient Japanese capital of Nara. A satellite campus is in the Umeda district of Osaka. There are about 11,000 students; 10% of them are international students. It is one of the major universities in Japan with a higher number of international students. In 2004, it was selected as one of the special universities under the Educational Support Program for Special Universities (特色ある大学教育支援プログラム) of the Ministry of Education, Culture, Sports, Science and Technology of the Japanese Government. The university's award-winning clean-energy solar car project frequently participated in domestic and international clean energy competitions. Yoshihiko Motoyama (本山美彦), former chairman of the Japan Society of International Economics, is its current president. Yoshikuni Dobashi, former president of Kubota Corporation, is the chairman of the board of directors.

== History ==
- 1928 Established as Osaka Railway School
- 1950 Developed as Osaka Transportation College
- 1965 Developed as Osaka Industrial University
- 1988 English name was changed from Osaka Industrial University to Osaka Sangyo University

== Organization ==
=== Faculties ===
- School of Engineering
  - Department of Mechanical Engineering
  - Department of Information Systems Engineering
  - Department of Electronics, Information and Communication Engineering
  - Department of Mechanical Engineering for Transportation
  - Department of Civil Engineering
- School of Economics
- School of Human Environment
- School of Management
- School of Education
- School of Design Engineering

=== Graduate schools ===
- Graduate School of Engineering
  - Division of Production Systems Engineering
    - Department of Information Systems Engineering
    - Department of Electronics, Information and Communication Engineering
    - Department of Mechanical Engineering
    - Department of Mechanical Engineering for Transportation
  - Division of Environmental Design Engineering
- Graduate School of Economics
- Graduate School of Human Environment
- Graduate School of Management

=== Research institutes ===
- OSU Institute for Industrial Research
- New Industrial Research and Development Center
- Asian Community Research Center

== Venture business ==
- OSU Digital Media Factory
- OSU Corporation
- OSU Health Support Academy Inc.
- Robust Engineering Corporation

== Solar Car Project ==
Osaka Sangyo University started the OSU Solar Car Project as an industry-academia project-based learning program since 1989. The project is focused on the research and development of high efficiency solar cars. The project is funded by major Japanese corporations including Panasonic, Citizen Holdings etc. OSU solar car models have been presented in domestic and international clean energy competitions.

| Year | Name of the Competition | Position |
|---|---|---|
| 1995 | FIA Dream Cup-Solar Car Race (Japan) | Second |
| 1996 | World Solar Challenge (Australia) | Eighth |
| 1996 | World Solar Car Rally (Japan) | Second |
| 1996 | World Solar Car Rally (Japan) | Second |
| 1996 | FIA Dream Cup-Solar Car Race (Japan) | Second |
