= All Japan Intercollegiate Volleyball Championship =

Intercollegiate volleyball tournament

- Sport: Volleyball
- Founded: 1948
- Country: Japan
- Most recent champions: Men: Waseda University; Women: NIFS
- Broadcaster: J Sports

All Japan Intercollegiate Volleyball Championship (全日本バレーボール大学男女選手権大会 Zen Nippon Barēbōru Daigaku Danjo Senshuken Taikai) is an annual nationwide intercollegiate volleyball tournament. It is the largest scale amateur sport event in Japan.

The tournament, organized by the Japan College School Volleyball Federation and Asahi Shimbun, takes place in December at Tokyo Metropolitan Gymnasium.

== Previous winners ==
Men

- 1948 - Waseda University
- 1948 - Meiji University
- 1950 - Waseda University
- 1951 - Keio University
- 1952 - Waseda University
- 1953 - Rikkyo University
- 1954 - Keio University
- 1955 - Meiji University
- 1956 - Kwansei Gakuin University
- 1957 - Rikkyo University
- 1958 - Kwansei Gakuin University
- 1959 - Chuo University
- 1960 - Kwansei Gakuin University
- 1961 - Rikkyo University
- 1962 - Kansai University
- 1963 - Chuo University
- 1964 - Keio University
- 1965 - Chuo University
- 1966 - Chuo University
- 1967 - Chuo University
- 1968 - Chuo University
- 1969 - Chuo University
- 1970 - Nippon Sport Science University
- 1971 - Chuo University
- 1972 - Hosei University
- 1973 - Osaka University of Commerce
- 1974 - Chuo University
- 1975 - Osaka University of Commerce
- 1976 - Chuo University
- 1977 - Osaka University of Commerce
- 1978 - Osaka University of Commerce
- 1979 - Chuo University
- 1980 - Hosei University
- 1981 - Nippon Sport Science University
- 1982 - Juntendo University
- 1983 - Hosei University
- 1984 - Hosei University
- 1985 - Hosei University
- 1986 - Nippon Sport Science University
- 1987 - Hosei University
- 1988 - Hosei University
- 1989 - Hosei University
- 1990 - Nippon Sport Science University
- 1991 - Hosei University
- 1992 - Nippon Sport Science University
- 1993 - Tokai University
- 1994 - Tokai University
- 1995 - Hosei University
- 1996 - Chuo University
- 1997 - University of Tsukuba
- 1998 - University of Tsukuba
- 1999 - University of Tsukuba
- 2000 - University of Tsukuba
- 2001 - University of Tsukuba
- 2002 - University of Tsukuba
- 2003 - Tokai University
- 2004 - University of Tsukuba
- 2005 - University of Tsukuba
- 2006 - Tokai University
- 2007 - Nippon Sport Science University
- 2008 - Nippon Sport Science University
- 2009 - Tokai University
- 2010 - Juntendo University
- 2013 - Waseda University
- 2014 - Chuo University
- 2015 - Chuo University
- 2016 - Chuo University
- 2017 - Waseda University
- 2018 - Waseda University
- 2019 - Waseda University
- 2020 - Waseda University
- 2021 - Waseda University

Women

- 1954 - Nippon Sport Science University
- 1955 - Kyoto University of Education
- 1956 - Mukogawa Women's University
- 1957 - Nippon Sport Science University
- 1958 - Nippon Sport Science University
- 1959 - Nippon Sport Science University
- 1960 - Nippon Sport Science University
- 1961 - Nippon Sport Science University
- 1962 - Nippon Sport Science University
- 1963 - Nippon Sport Science University
- 1964 - Nippon Sport Science University
- 1965 - Nippon Sport Science University
- 1966 - Nippon Sport Science University
- 1967 - Nippon Sport Science University
- 1968 - Nippon Sport Science University
- 1969 - Nippon Sport Science University
- 1970 - JWCPE
- 1971 - Nippon Sport Science University
- 1972 - Nippon Sport Science University
- 1973 - Nippon Sport Science University
- 1974 - Chukyo University
- 1975 - Nippon Sport Science University
- 1976 - Nippon Sport Science University
- 1977 - Nippon Sport Science University
- 1978 - Nippon Sport Science University
- 1979 - Nippon Sport Science University
- 1980 - Nippon Sport Science University
- 1981 - JWCPE
- 1982 - Nippon Sport Science University
- 1983 - Nippon Sport Science University
- 1984 - Nippon Sport Science University
- 1985 - University of Tsukuba
- 1986 - University of Tsukuba
- 1987 - University of Tsukuba
- 1988 - Aoyama Gakuin University
- 1989 - Tokai University
- 1990 - Nippon Sport Science University
- 1991 - Tokai University
- 1992 - Kaetsu Junior College
- 1993 - Nippon Sport Science University
- 1994 - Tokai University
- 1995 - Tokai University
- 1996 - Tohoku Fukushi University
- 1997 - Tohoku Fukushi University
- 1998 - Tokai University
- 1999 - JWCPE
- 2000 - Kaetsu Junior College
- 2001 - Kaetsu University
- 2002 - University of Tsukuba
- 2003 - University of Tsukuba
- 2004 - Kaetsu University
- 2005 - Aoyama Gakuin University
- 2006 - Aoyama Gakuin University
- 2007 - Kaetsu University
- 2008 - Aoyama Gakuin University
- 2009 - University of Tsukuba
- 2010 - NIFS
- 2011 - Tokai University
- 2012 - Kaetsu University
- 2013 - NIFS
- 2014 - Nippon Sport Science University
- 2015 - Tokai University
- 2016 - NIFS
- 2017 - Aoyama Gakuin University
- 2018 - University of Tsukuba
- 2019 - University of Tsukuba
- 2020 - NIFS
- 2021 - Tokai University
