= Kaetsu University =

Private university in Japan

Coordinates: 35°43′14″N 139°30′57″E

Kaetsu University (嘉悦大学, Kaetsu daigaku) is a private university in Kodaira, Tokyo, Japan, established in 2001. The predecessor of the school was founded in 1903.

The school was founded by Taka Kaetsu in 1903 as a women's commercial school. It was renamed Japan Commercial Girls’ School in 1919 and the Japan Commercial Girls’ High School in 1929. In 1944 it became the Japan Women's College of Economics and the Japan Women's College of Economics in 1950, awarding certified public accountant degrees. The school was renamed Kaetsu Women's College and relocated to its present location in 1982. A four-year Department of Management and Economics for men and women was established in 2001, with the two-year program continuing to be offered only to women. A graduate program was created in 2010.
