= Naonobu Fujii =

Japanese volleyball player (1992–2023)

Personal information
- Full name: Naonobu Fujii
- Nickname: Nakkun
- Nationality: Japanese
- Born: January 5, 1992 Miyagi, Japan
- Died: March 10, 2023 (aged 31)
- Education: Juntendo University
- Height: 183 cm (6 ft 0 in)
- Weight: 80 kg (176 lb)
- Spike: 312 cm (123 in)
- Block: 297 cm (117 in)

Volleyball information
- Position: Setter
- Number: Club #21; National Team #3

Career
- Years: Team
- 2014–2022: Toray Arrows

National team
- Years: Team
- 2017–2021: Japan
Medal record
Men's volleyball
Representing Japan
Japanese Championship
Gold medal – first place	2017 Gresik	Team
Silver medal – second place	2021 Chiba/Funabashi	Team
Bronze medal – third place	2019 Tehran	Team

Naonobu Fujii (Japanese: 藤井 直伸, Hepburn: Fujii Naonobu; January 5, 1992 – March 10, 2023) was a Japanese volleyball player, who was also a member of the Japan men's national volleyball team and of Toray Arrows.

== Personal life ==
Naonobu Fujii grew up in Miyagi, Japan where he attended Furukawa Industrial High School, a school known for its volleyball team. Gaining an interest in the sport, he went on to play for Juntendo University. He enjoyed outdoor activities such as cycling in his free time.

His family home was swept away by the tsunami caused by the Tohoku earthquake. Due to the disaster, his father became unemployed, and Fujii nearly gave up his dream of playing volleyball but continued with his family's encouragement.

In September 2021, Fujii announced that he had married Miya Sato, who was a setter of the Japan women's national volleyball team and Hitachi Rivale club.

On February 27, 2022, Fujii announced that he has been diagnosed with Stage IV Stomach Cancer, which had metastasized to his brain.

Fujii died from stomach cancer on March 10, 2023, at the age of 31. JVA sent out their condolences to his family and the Japanese volleyball community mourned his loss.

== Career ==
After college Fujii went on to join the Torray Arrows team as a setter. Starting in the 2016–17 season, he was selected for the Japan men's national volleyball team where he played as number 3. In 2021, he was one of the Japanese men's national team roster, which competed in 2020 Summer Olympics, and the team finished in 7th place after 29 years.

== Awards ==
=== Individual ===
- 2017 Asian Men's Volleyball Championship- Best Setter
- 2023: V.League - Special award

=== Club teams ===
- 2016/2017 V.Premier League Men's – Best 6, with Torray Arrows
