= Yuta Yoneyama =

Japanese volleyball player (born 1984)

Personal information
- Nationality: Japanese
- Born: 29 August 1984 (age 42) Ranzan, Saitama, Japan
- Height: 1.85 m (6 ft 1 in)
- Weight: 85 kg (187 lb)
- Spike: 340 cm (134 in)
- Block: 320 cm (126 in)

Volleyball information
- Position: Outside hitter
- Current club: (Japan) Toray Arrows
- Number: 5

Career
- Years: Team
- 2007–present: (Japan) Toray Arrows

National team
- Years: Team
- 2010–2017: Japan

Yuta Yoneyama (米山 裕太, Yoneyama Yūta; born 29 August 1984) is a Japanese male volleyball player. He was part of the Japan men's national volleyball team at the 2010 FIVB Volleyball Men's World Championship in Italy. Currently, he plays for Toray Arrows on the club level.

== Clubs ==
- (Japan) Toray Arrows (2007–)
