= Toray Arrows Men's Volleyball Club =

Japanese volleyball club

Toray Arrows
- Short name: Toray (東レ)
- Founded: 1947
- Ground: Mishima, Shizuoka Prefecture, Japan
- Head Coach: (Japan) Abe Yuta
- Captain: (Japan) Yuto Fujinaka
- League: SV.League
- 2024–25: 8th place
- Website: Club home page
- Championships: 3

Toray Arrows (東レアローズ) or stylized as TORAY ARROWS SHIZUOKA is a men's volleyball team based in Mishima city, Shizuoka, Japan. They play in SV.League, the highest Japanese men's volleyball league. The owner of the team is Toray Industries.

== History ==
The team was founded in 1947 as "Toray Kuryukai" at the Shiga Plant of Toray Industries, Inc. The name "Kuryukai" comes from the nine players in the team and the "Crane Wing Formation" in Sun Tzu's "The Art of War".

In 1961, the team won the title in the 9-player division of the All-Japan Championship and the 6-player and 9-player divisions of the National Sports Festival. In 1963, the team won its second title in the 9-player division of the All-Japan Championship and moved its home base to Mishima the following year.

In the Japan Industrial League (then V.Challenge League), the team was promoted in the 6th league in 1974 but was relegated five years later and returned in 1988. In the first V LEAGUE, the team advanced to the final in first place but finished fourth in the final league. After a slump, the team finished second in the 5th, 6th, and 8th V LEAGUE. In the 10th V LEAGUE, the team narrowly missed the relegation playoffs. However, in the 11th V LEAGUE, under the slogan "Total Power", the team achieved its first championship by continuing its winning streak of 20 games from the opening of the league.

In the 2008/09 season, the team won its second championship in four seasons by defeating Sakai in the championship game. The team won its third championship in eight seasons in the 2016/17 season. The team aims to be loved by everyone and grateful for the environment in which they can play volleyball. This season, under the slogan "BREAK THE TARGET", the team aims to break through the target of winning the championship.

Toray Arrows joined Asian Club Championship to represent Japan for the first time in 2018 and ranked the 5th place.

== Honours ==
- Japan Volleyball League/V.League/V.Premier League
  Champions (×3): 2004–05, 2008–09, 2016–17
  Runners-up (×6): 1998–99, 1999–00, 2001–02, 2006–07, 2007–08, 2011–12
- Kurowashiki Tournament
  Champions (×6): 1961, 1963, 2002, 2005, 2006, 2011
  Runners-up (×4): 1953, 1959, 2004, 2009
- Emperor's Cup
  Champions (×2): 2008, 2013
  Runner-up (×3): 2012, 2019, 2022

== Team roster ==
=== Current roster ===
The following is team roster of 2026–27 SV.League
Updated : November 16, 2026

No.	Name	Date of birth	Height	Position
1	(Japan) Namba Takahiro	May 1, 1998 (age 28)	1.98 m (6 ft 6 in)	Middle Blocker
2	(Japan) Shin Takahiro	August 10, 1991 (age 35)	1.81 m (5 ft 11 in)	Setter
4	(Canada) Skyler Varga	March 6, 2003 (age 23)	2.01 m (6 ft 7 in)	Outside Hitter
5	(United States) Gabriel Garcia	January 8, 1999 (age 27)	2.00 m (6 ft 7 in)	Opposite Hitter
6	(Japan) Gaku Kusumoto	June 8, 2002 (age 24)	1.77 m (5 ft 10 in)	Outside Hitter
7	(Japan) Alain Dearmas	March 4, 2001 (age 25)	1.89 m (6 ft 2 in)	Outside Hitter
8	(Japan) Kento Nakashima	October 15, 2001 (age 25)	1.72 m (5 ft 8 in)	Setter
9	(Japan) Takumi Mawatari	June 2, 2003 (age 23)	1.84 m (6 ft 0 in)	Outside Hitter
10	(Japan) Tobias Takeshi	February 8, 2001 (age 25)	1.91 m (6 ft 3 in)	Outside Hitter
11	(Japan) Soshi Fujinaka	December 2, 1999 (age 26)	1.77 m (5 ft 10 in)	Libero
12	(Japan) Daiki Yamada	August 7, 2001 (age 25)	1.91 m (6 ft 3 in)	Outside Hitter
13	(United States) Taylor Averill	March 5, 1992 (age 34)	2.01 m (6 ft 7 in)	Middle Blocker
14	(Italy) Edoardo Caneschi	January 26, 1997 (age 29)	2.05 m (6 ft 9 in)	Middle Blocker
15	(Japan) Haku Ri	December 27, 1990 (age 35)	1.95 m (6 ft 5 in)	Middle Blocker
16	(Japan) Kamijo Reimondo	September 16, 1999 (age 27)	1.95 m (6 ft 5 in)	Middle Blocker
18	(Japan) Hiroaki Maki	November 2, 2003 (age 23)	2.10 m (6 ft 11 in)	Outside Hitter
19	(Japan) Taishu Takeda	August 25, 2001 (age 25)	1.71 m (5 ft 7 in)	Libero
20	(Japan) Eiki Onodera	December 2, 2001 (age 24)	1.87 m (6 ft 2 in)	Setter
Head coach: (Japan) Abe Yuta

=== Former roster ===
Team roster – Season 2025-2026
No.	Name	Date of birth	Height	Position
1	Takahiro Namba	May 1, 1998 (age 28)	1.98 m (6 ft 6 in)	Middle blocker
2	Takahiro Shin	August 10, 1991 (age 35)	1.81 m (5 ft 11 in)	Setter
3	Takumi Yamaguchi (sub-c)	August 3, 1997 (age 29)	1.68 m (5 ft 6 in)	Libero
4	Keisuke Sakai	August 25, 1996 (age 30)	1.87 m (6 ft 2 in)	Setter
6	Gaku Kusumoto	June 8, 2002 (age 24)	1.77 m (5 ft 10 in)	Outside hitter
8	Yuto Fujinaka (c)	April 20, 1996 (age 30)	1.82 m (6 ft 0 in)	Outside hitter
10	Tobias Takeshi	February 8, 2001 (age 25)	1.91 m (6 ft 3 in)	Outside hitter
11	Kirill Klets	March 15, 1998 (age 28)	2.10 m (6 ft 11 in)	Opposite hitter
12	Daiki Yamada	August 7, 2001 (age 25)	1.91 m (6 ft 3 in)	Outside hitter
13	Taylor Averill	March 5, 1992 (age 34)	2.01 m (6 ft 7 in)	Middle blocker
15	Haku Ri	December 27, 1990 (age 35)	1.95 m (6 ft 5 in)	Middle blocker
16	Reimondo Kamijo	September 16, 1999 (age 27)	1.95 m (6 ft 5 in)	Middle blocker
17	Hiroki Ozawa	September 21, 1997 (age 29)	1.86 m (6 ft 1 in)	Outside hitter
19	Taishu Takeda	August 25, 2001 (age 25)	1.71 m (5 ft 7 in)	Libero
20	Eiki Onodera	December 2, 2001 (age 24)	1.87 m (6 ft 2 in)	Setter
22	Ryusuke Nakamura	December 26, 1997 (age 28)	1.94 m (6 ft 4 in)	Middle blocker
24	Julio Cesar Cardenas Morales	September 4, 2000 (age 26)	1.97 m (6 ft 6 in)	Outside hitter
Head coach: (Japan) Abe Yuta

Team roster – Season 2023-2024
No.	Name	Date of birth	Height	Position
1	Takahiro Namba	May 1, 1998 (age 28)	1.98 m (6 ft 6 in)	Middle blocker
2	Kentaro Takahashi	February 8, 1995 (age 31)	2.01 m (6 ft 7 in)	Middle blocker
3	Takumi Yamaguchi	August 3, 1997 (age 29)	1.68 m (5 ft 6 in)	Libero
4	Keisuke Sakai	August 25, 1996 (age 30)	1.87 m (6 ft 2 in)	Setter
5	Yuta Yoneyama	August 29, 1984 (age 42)	1.85 m (6 ft 1 in)	Outside hitter
6	Shunsuke Watanabe	April 11, 1988 (age 38)	1.81 m (5 ft 11 in)	Libero
7	Yudai Minemura (c)	May 19, 1994 (age 32)	1.85 m (6 ft 1 in)	Outside hitter
8	Koyu Manago	September 14, 1998 (age 28)	1.84 m (6 ft 0 in)	Setter
9	Shoma Tomita	June 20, 1997 (age 29)	1.90 m (6 ft 3 in)	Outside hitter
10	Tobias Takeshi	February 8, 2001 (age 25)	1.91 m (6 ft 3 in)	Outside hitter
11	(China) Xu Ke	March 1, 2001 (age 25)	2.01 m (6 ft 7 in)	Outside hitter
14	(Hungary) Krisztián Pádár	November 14, 1996 (age 30)	1.99 m (6 ft 6 in)	Opposite
15	Haku Ri	December 27, 1990 (age 35)	1.95 m (6 ft 5 in)	Middle blocker
16	Reimondo Kamijo	September 16, 1999 (age 27)	1.95 m (6 ft 5 in)	Middle blocker
17	Hiroki Ozawa	September 21, 1997 (age 29)	1.86 m (6 ft 1 in)	Outside hitter
18	Keigo Nishimoto	October 27, 1998 (age 28)	1.89 m (6 ft 2 in)	Middle blocker
Head coach: (Japan) Ayumu Shinoda

Team roster – Season 2022-2023
No.	Name	Date of birth	Height	Position
1	Takahiro Namba	May 1, 1998 (age 28)	1.98 m (6 ft 6 in)	Middle blocker
2	Kentaro Takahashi	February 8, 1995 (age 31)	2.01 m (6 ft 7 in)	Middle blocker
3	Takumi Yamaguchi	August 3, 1997 (age 29)	1.68 m (5 ft 6 in)	Libero
4	Keisuke Sakai	August 25, 1996 (age 30)	1.87 m (6 ft 2 in)	Setter
5	Yuta Yoneyama	August 29, 1984 (age 42)	1.85 m (6 ft 1 in)	Outside hitter
6	Dai Tezuka	November 18, 1988 (age 37)	1.92 m (6 ft 4 in)	Outside hitter
7	Yudai Minemura (c)	May 19, 1994 (age 32)	1.85 m (6 ft 1 in)	Outside hitter
8	Koyu Manago	September 14, 1998 (age 28)	1.84 m (6 ft 0 in)	Setter
9	Shoma Tomita	June 20, 1997 (age 29)	1.90 m (6 ft 3 in)	Outside hitter
10	Tobias Takeshi	February 8, 2001 (age 25)	1.91 m (6 ft 3 in)	Outside hitter
14	(Hungary) Krisztián Pádár	November 14, 1996 (age 30)	1.99 m (6 ft 6 in)	Opposite
15	Haku Ri	December 27, 1990 (age 35)	1.95 m (6 ft 5 in)	Middle blocker
16	Reimondo Kamijo	September 16, 1999 (age 27)	1.95 m (6 ft 5 in)	Middle blocker
17	Hiroki Ozawa	September 21, 1997 (age 29)	1.86 m (6 ft 1 in)	Outside hitter
18	Keigo Nishimoto	October 27, 1998 (age 28)	1.89 m (6 ft 2 in)	Middle blocker
21	Naonobu Fujii	January 5, 1992 (age 34)	1.83 m (6 ft 0 in)	Setter
Head coach: (Japan) Ayumu Shinoda

== Notable players ==
=== Local players ===
(Japan) Yuta Yoneyama (2007–present)
(Japan) Naonobu Fujii (2014–2023)

=== Foreign players ===
(United States) Lloy Ball (1996–1999)
(Russia) Pavel Abramov (2003–2005)
(Bulgaria) Vladimir Nikolov (2006–2007)

== League results ==
Champion Runner-up

League		Position	Teams	Matches	Win	Lose
V.League	1st (1994–95)	4th	8	21	15	6
V.League	2nd (1995–96)	5th	8	21	11	10
V.League	3rd (1996–97)	6th	8	21	10	11
V.League	4th (1997–98)	7th	8	21	5	16
V.League	5th (1998–99)	Runner-up	10	18	13	5
V.League	6th (1999-00)	Runner-up	10	18	12	6
V.League	7th (2000–01)	3rd	10	18	13	5
V.League	8th (2001–02)	Runner-up	10	18	14	4
V.League	9th (2002–03)	5th	8	21	12	9
V.League	10th (2003–04)	7th	8	21	10	11
V.League	11th (2004–05)	Champion	8	28	25	3
V.League	12th (2005–06)	6th	8	28	15	13
V・Premier
V・Premier	2006-07	Ruuner-up	8	28	22	6
V・Premier	2007-08	Runner-up	8	28	17	11
V・Premier	2008-09	Champion	8	28	20	7
V・Premier	2009-10	3rd	8	28	19	9
V・Premier	2010-11	3rd	8	24	15	9
V・Premier	2011-12	Runner-up	8	21	19	2
V・Premier	2012-13	3rd	8	28	17	11
V・Premier	2013-14	4th	8	28	15	13
V・Premier	2014-15	7th	8	21	8	13
V・Premier	2015–16	3rd	8	27	18	9
V・Premier	2016–17	Champion	8	28	21	7
V・Premier	2017–18	5th	8	26	18	8
V.League Division 1	2018–19	3rd	10	34	20	14
V.League Division 1	2019–20	6th	10	27	12	15
V.League Division 1	2020–21	5th	10	33	17	16
V.League Division 1	2021–22	4th	10	36	25	11
V.League Division 1	2022–23	5th	10	36	23	13
SV.League	2024-25	8th	10	44	12	32
SV.League	2025-26	8th	10	44	13	31
