= Dainichi Kofun =

- 大日古墳 (Japanese)
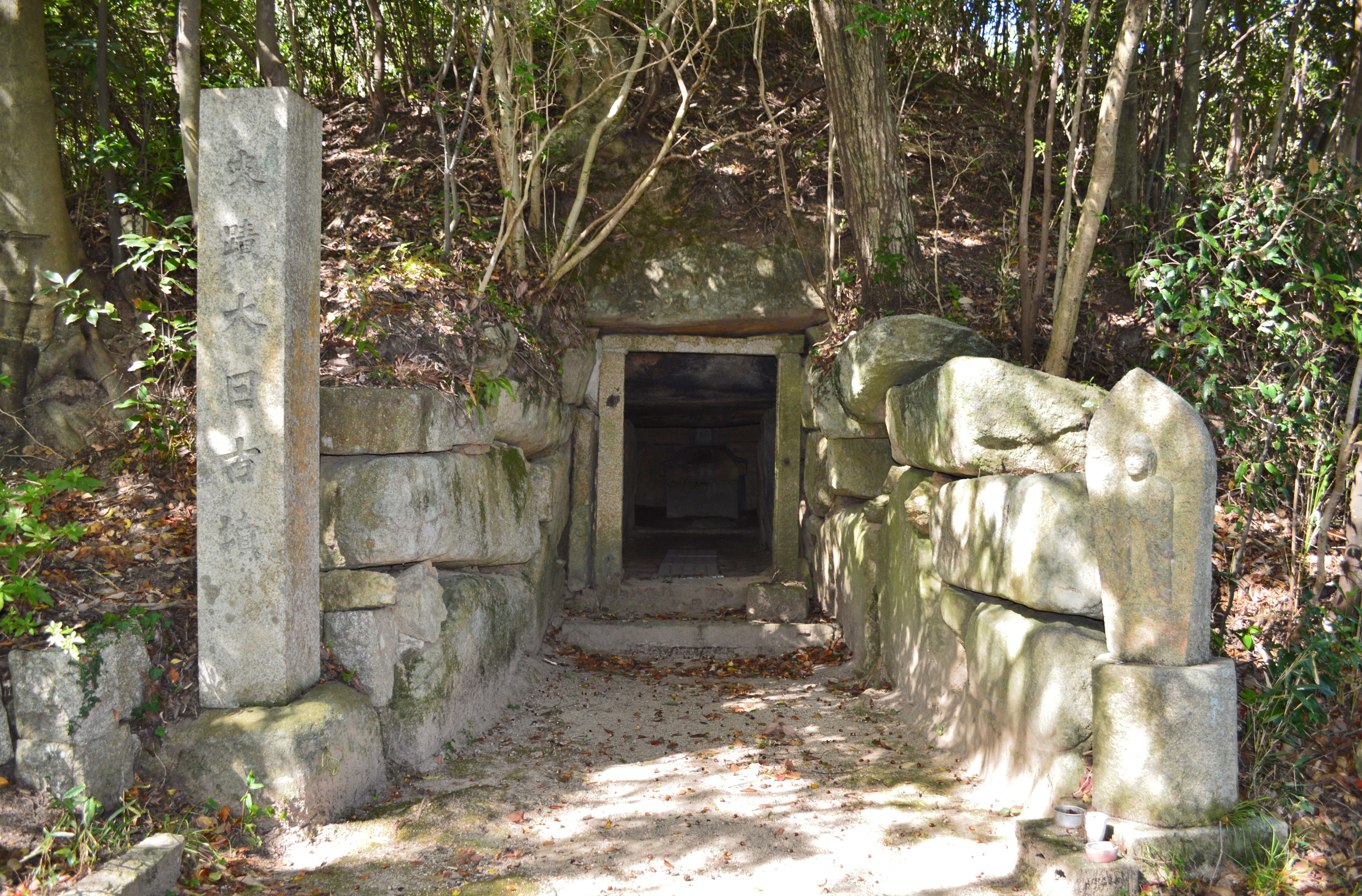
- Dainichi Kofun

- Dainichi Kofun Dainichi Kofun (Japan)
- 34°04′20″N 131°32′51″E
- Type: Kofun
- Periods: Kofun period
- Location: Hōfu, Yamaguchi, Japan
- Region: San'yō region

History
- Built: c.7th century

Site notes
- Public access: Yes (no facilities)
- National Historic Site of Japan

The Dainichi Kofun (大日古墳) is a Kofun period burial mound located in the Takai neighborhood of the city of Hōfu, Yamaguchi in the San'yō region of Japan. The tumulus was designated a National Historic Site of Japan in 1948.

== Overview ==
The Dainichi Kofun is located on a plateau at the foot of Mount Nishime overlooking northwestern part of the Hōfu Plain on the right bank of the Sabagawa River in southern Yamaguchi Prefecture. It is believed to be a zenpō-kōen-fun (前方後円墳), which is shaped like a keyhole, having one square end and one circular end, when viewed from above; however, the presumed anterior portion has been turned into a cemetery and no archaeological evidence has been found to verify its existence. Further doubt is cast by the presumed construction period of the tumulus, which appears to date from the latter half of the 7th century, at the end of the Kofun period, as keyhole-shaped burial mounds generally disappeared between the end of the 6th century and the beginning of the 7th century. It is probable, therefore, that the tumulus is an elongated enpun (円墳) style circular tumulus orientated to the southwest, with dimensions of roughly 40 by 20 meters. No haniwa have been found on the surface of the mound. The burial chamber is a horizontal stone chamber similar to the burial chamber of Iwayayama Kofun in Nara Prefecture. It is the longest stone chamber in Yamaguchi Prefecture with a total length of 13.2 meters, and a hollowed-out house-shaped sarcophagus made of stratified hyaloclastite was brought to this location from the Kakogawa basin in Hyōgo Prefecture. No grave goods have been found. The style of the burial chamber and the sarcophagus indicate an extremely strong connection with the Kinai region. It is not clear who was buried in this tumulus, but according to local legends, it is believed to the tomb of Prince Imseong of Baekje (the ancestor of the Ōuchi clan)

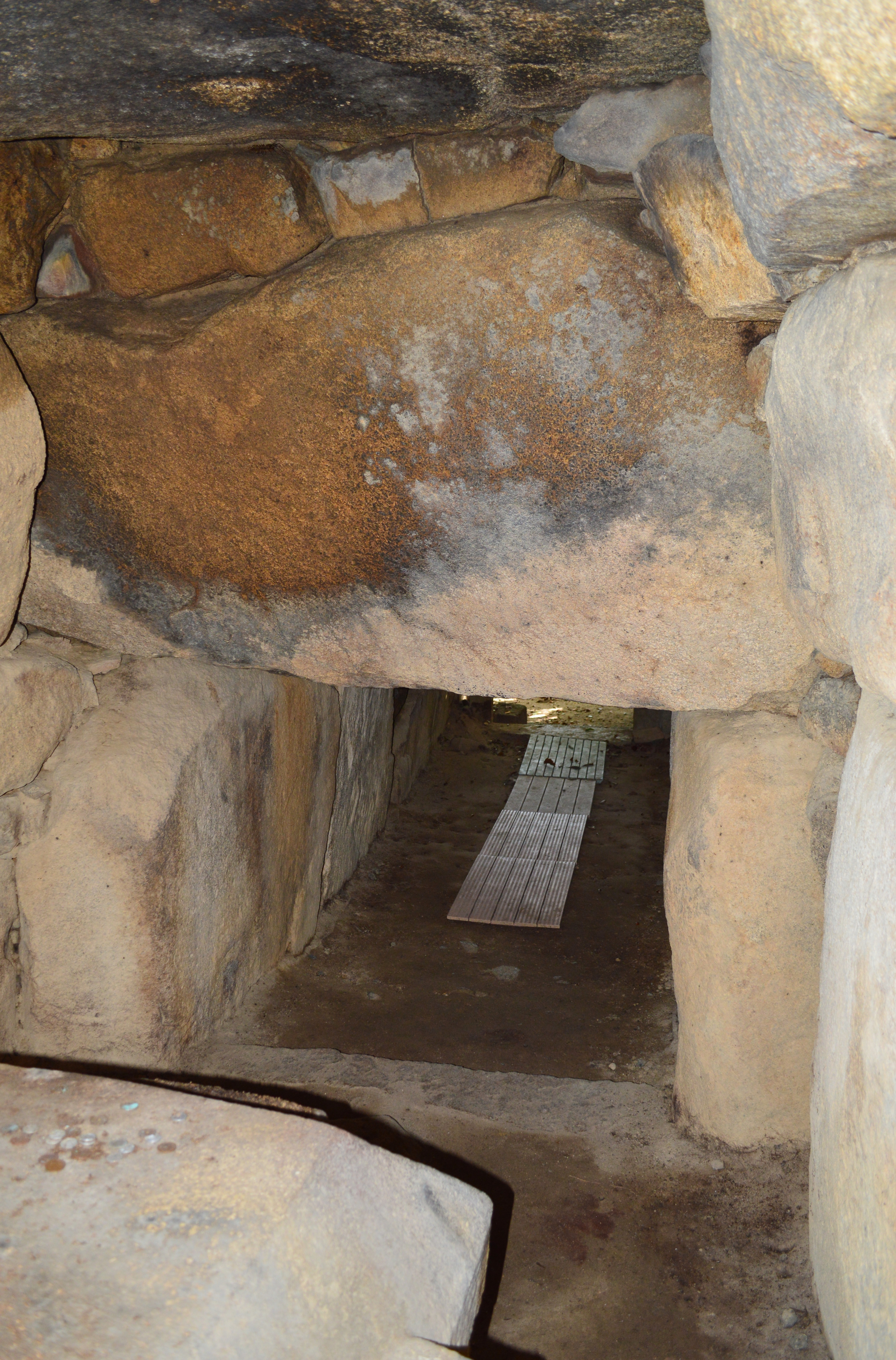
Burial chamber

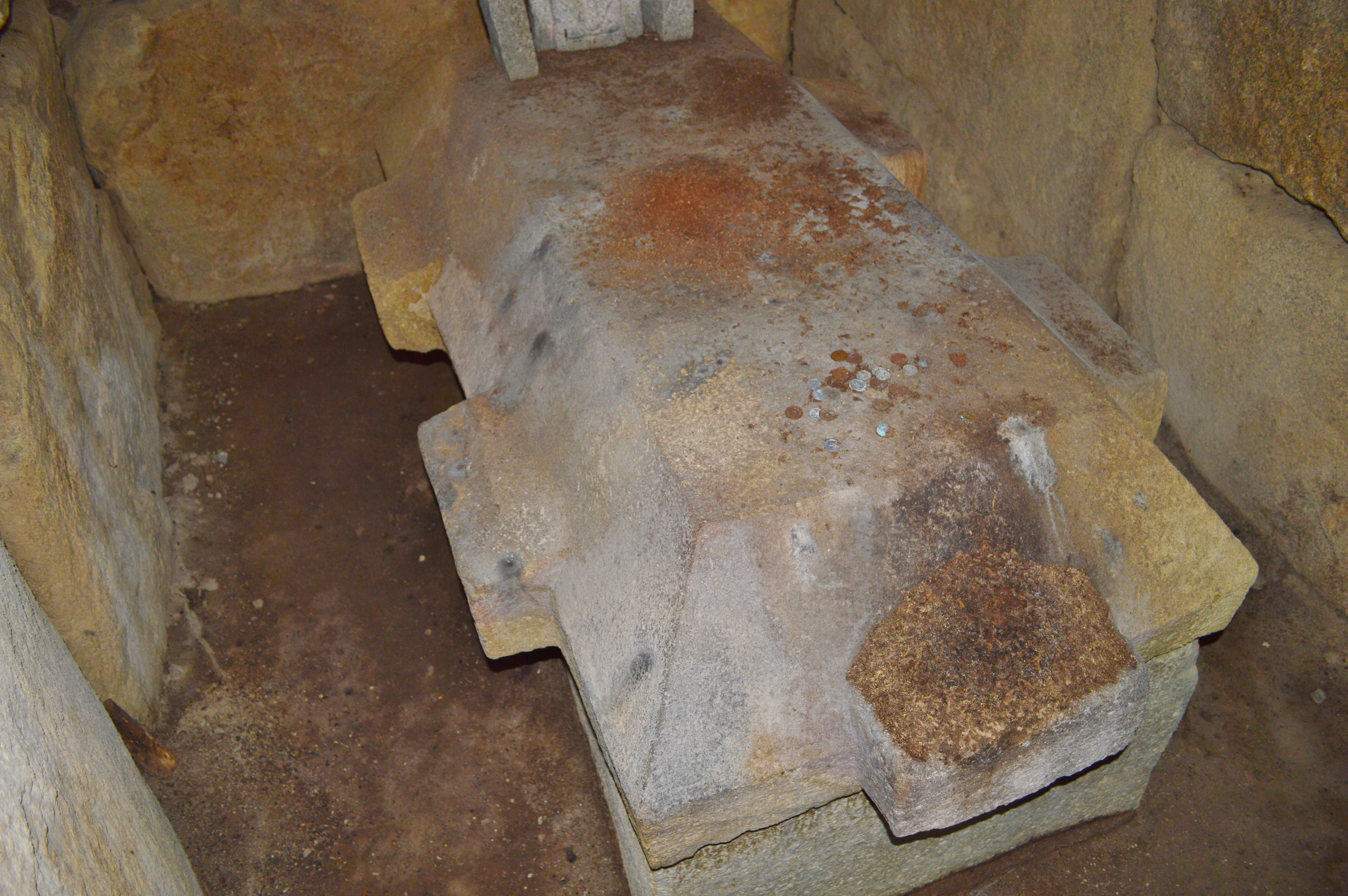
Sarcophagus

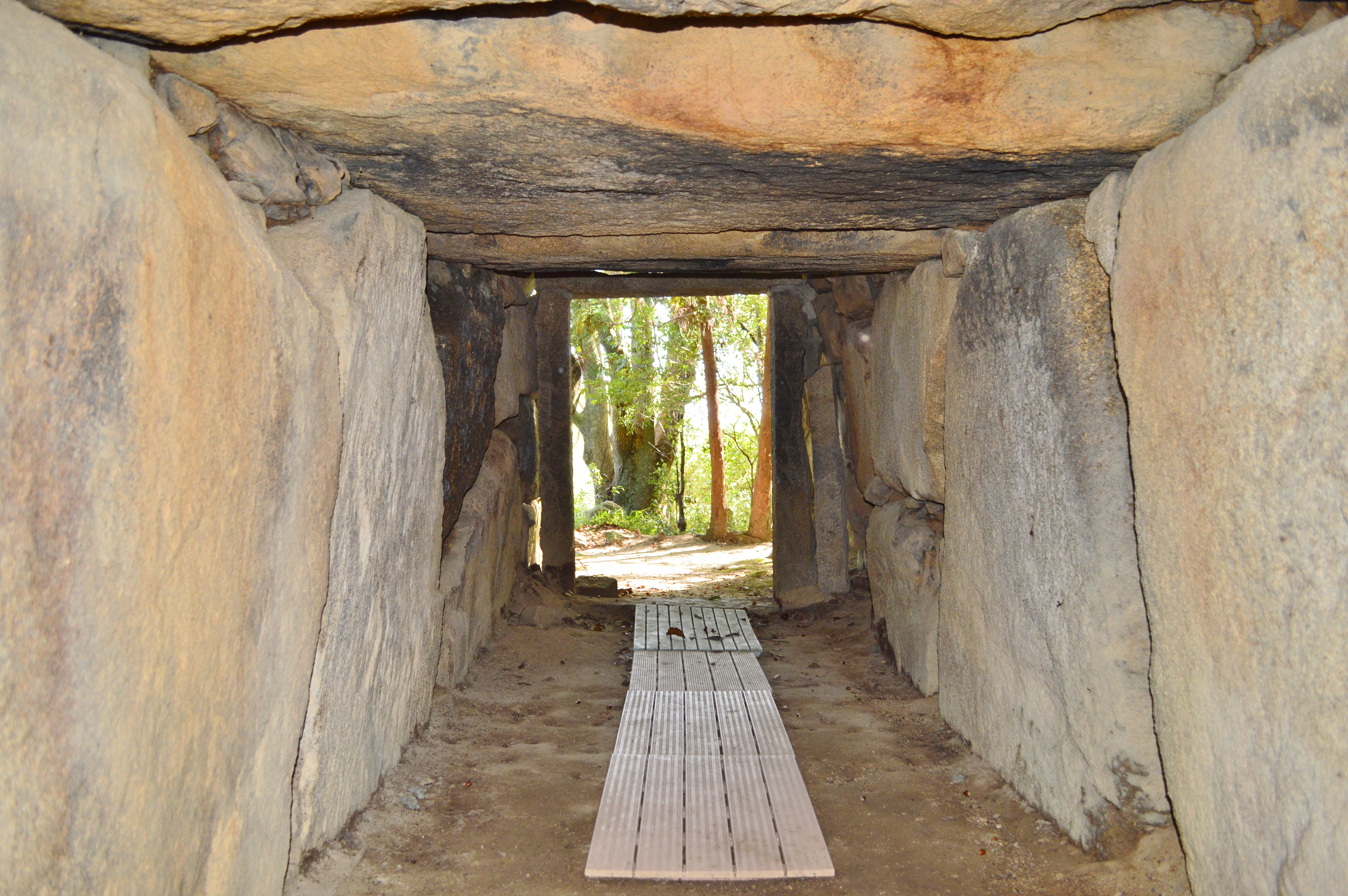
Corridor, lookin towards entrance

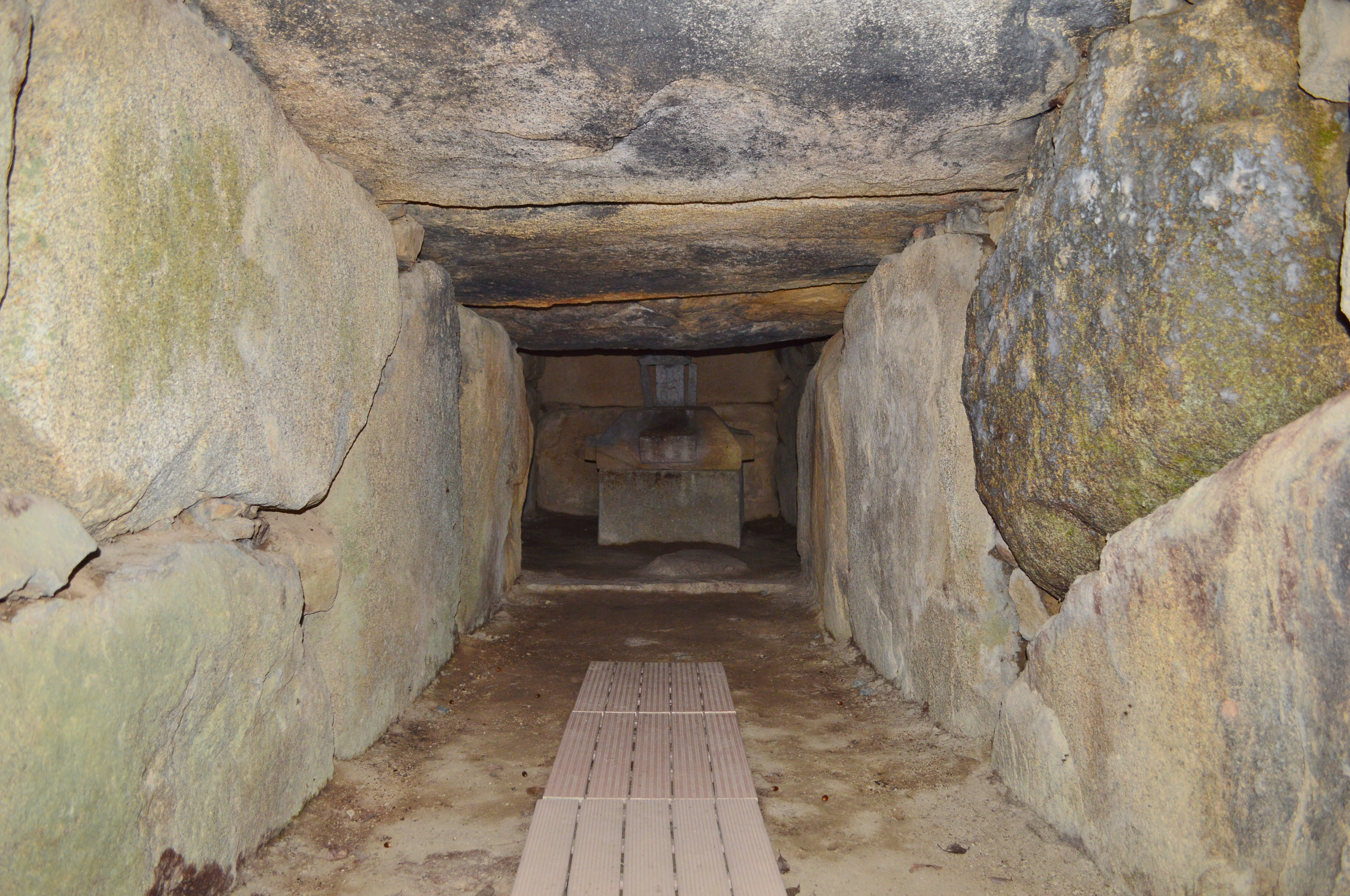
Corridor, looking towards burial chamber

== See also ==
- List of Historic Sites of Japan (Yamaguchi)
