= Fukugawa Station =

Railway station in Shūnan, Yamaguchi Prefecture, Japan

Fukugawa Station 福川駅
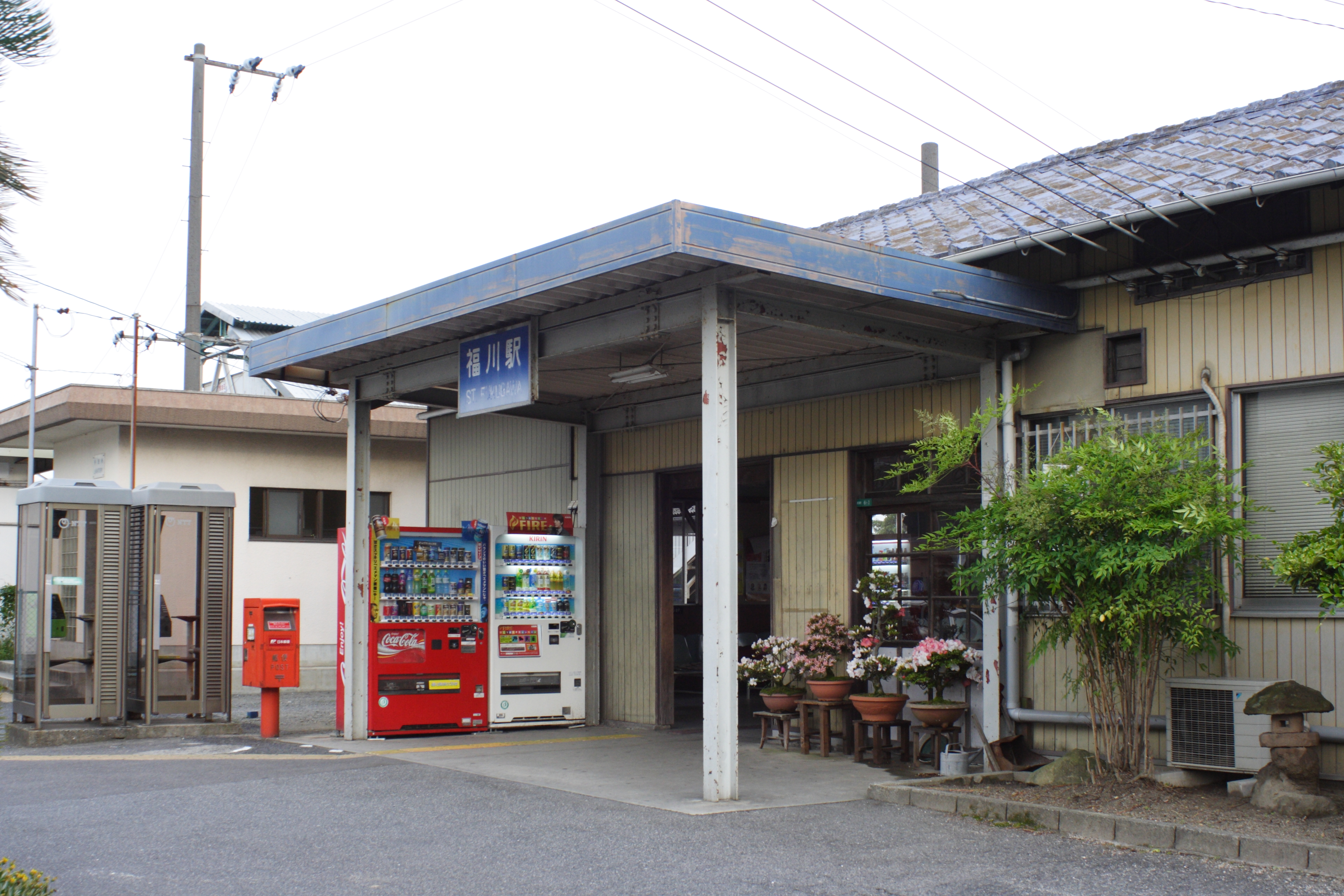
- Fukagawa Station in May 2011

General information
- Location: 6 Shachichō, Shūnan-shi, Yamaguchi-ken 746-0041; Japan
- Coordinates: 34°4′19.88″N 131°44′17.94″E
- Owner: West Japan Railway Company
- Operator: West Japan Railway Company
- Line: San'yō Line
- Distance: 421.9 km (262.2 miles) from Kobe
- Platforms: 2 side platforms
- Tracks: 3
- Connections: Bus stop

Other information
- Status: Unstaffed
- Website: Official website

History
- Opened: 17 March 1897

Passengers
- FY2022: 616

Services
Preceding station	JR West	Following station
Heta towards Shimonoseki	San'yō Line Local	Shinnan-yō towards Iwakuni
Location
- Location within Yamaguchi Prefecture Location within Japan

Fukugawa Station (福川駅, Fukugawa-eki) is a passenger railway station located in the city of Shūnan, Yamaguchi Prefecture, Japan. It is operated by the West Japan Railway Company (JR West).

== Lines ==
Fukugawa Station is served by the JR West Sanyō Main Line, and is located 421.9 kilometers from the terminus of the line at Kobe.

== Station layout ==
The station consists of two opposed side platforms connected by a footbridge. The station is unattended.

== Platforms ==
1	■ San'yō Line	for Tokuyama and Iwakuni
2	■ San'yō Line	for Hōfu, Shin-Yamaguchi and Shimonoseki

== History ==
Fukugawa Station was opened on 17 March 1897 as a station on the San'yo Railway when the line was extended from Tokuyama to Hōfu Station. The San'yo Railway was railway nationalized in 1906 and the line renamed the San'yō Main Line in 1909. With the privatization of the Japan National Railway (JNR) on 1 April 1987, the station came under the aegis of the West Japan railway Company (JR West).

== Passenger statistics ==
In fiscal 2022, the station was used by an average of 616 passengers daily.

== Surrounding area ==
- Shunan City New Nanyo Baseball Stadium
- Shunan Municipal Fukugawa Elementary School
- Shunan Municipal Fukugawa Minami Elementary School
- Shunan Municipal Fukugawa Junior High School
- Yamaguchi Prefectural Nanyo Technical High School

== See also ==
- List of railway stations in Japan
