= Daidō Station =

Railway station in Hōfu, Yamaguchi Prefecture, Japan

Daidō Station 大道駅
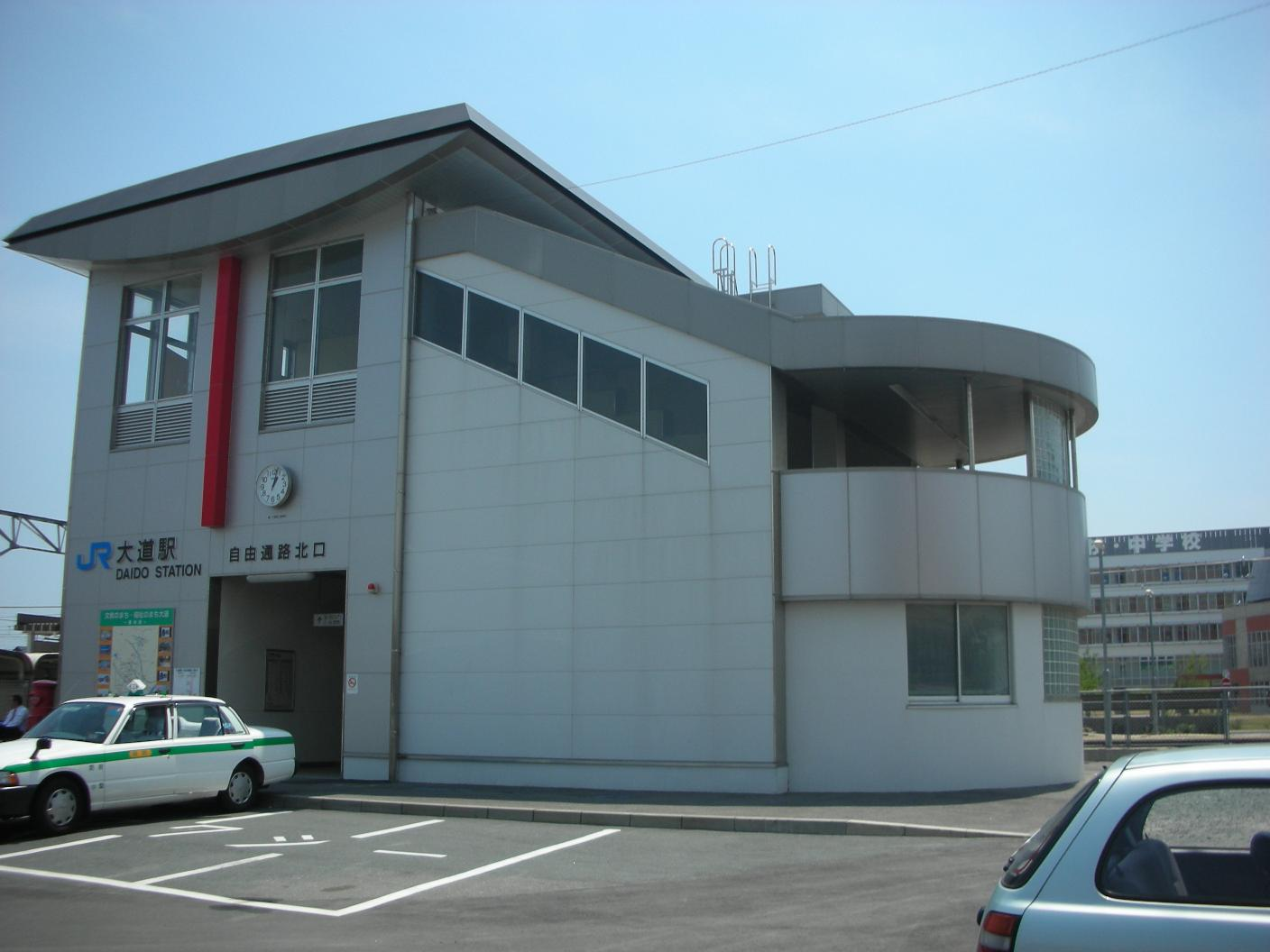
- Daidō Station in June 2007

General information
- Location: 3607 Daidō, Hōfu-shi, Yamaguchi-ken 747-1232; Japan
- Coordinates: 34°3′11.72″N 131°29′18.48″E
- Owner: West Japan Railway Company
- Operator: West Japan Railway Company
- Line: San'yō Line
- Distance: 449.2 km (279.1 miles) from Kobe
- Platforms: 1 side + 1 island platforms
- Tracks: 3
- Connections: Bus stop

Construction
- Accessible: Yes

Other information
- Status: Staffed
- Website: Official website

History
- Opened: 3 December 1900; 125 years ago

Passengers
- FY2022: 1272

Services
Preceding station	JR West	Following station
Yotsutsuji towards Shimonoseki	San'yō Line Local	Hōfu towards Iwakuni
Location
- Location within Yamaguchi Prefecture Location within Japan

Daidō Station (大道駅, Daidō-eki) is a passenger railway station located in the city of Hōfu, Yamaguchi Prefecture, Japan. It is operated by the West Japan Railway Company (JR West).

== Lines ==
Daidō Station is served by the JR West Sanyō Main Line, and is located 449.2 kilometers from the terminus of the line at Kobe.

== Station layout ==
The station consists of one side platform and one island platform connected by a footbridge. The station is staffed.

== Platforms ==
1	■ San'yō Line	for Hōfu, Tokuyama and Iwakuni
2, 3	■ San'yō Line	for Shin-Yamaguchi and Shimonoseki

== History ==
Daidō Station was opened on 3 December 1900 as a station on the San'yo Railway. The San'yo Railway was railway nationalized in 1906 and the line renamed the San'yo Main Line in 1909. With the privatization of the Japan National Railway (JNR) on 1 April 1987, the station came under the aegis of the West Japan Railway Company (JR West).

== Passenger statistics ==
In fiscal 2022, the station was used by an average of 1272 passengers daily.

== Surrounding area ==
- Japan National Route 2
- Yamaguchi Junior College
- Takagawa Gakuen High School/Junior High School (former Tatara Gakuen High School)
- Yamaguchi Prefectural Hofu West High School

== See also ==
- List of railway stations in Japan
