= Shinnan-yō Station =

Railway station in Shūnan, Yamaguchi Prefecture, Japan

Shinnan-yō Station 新南陽駅
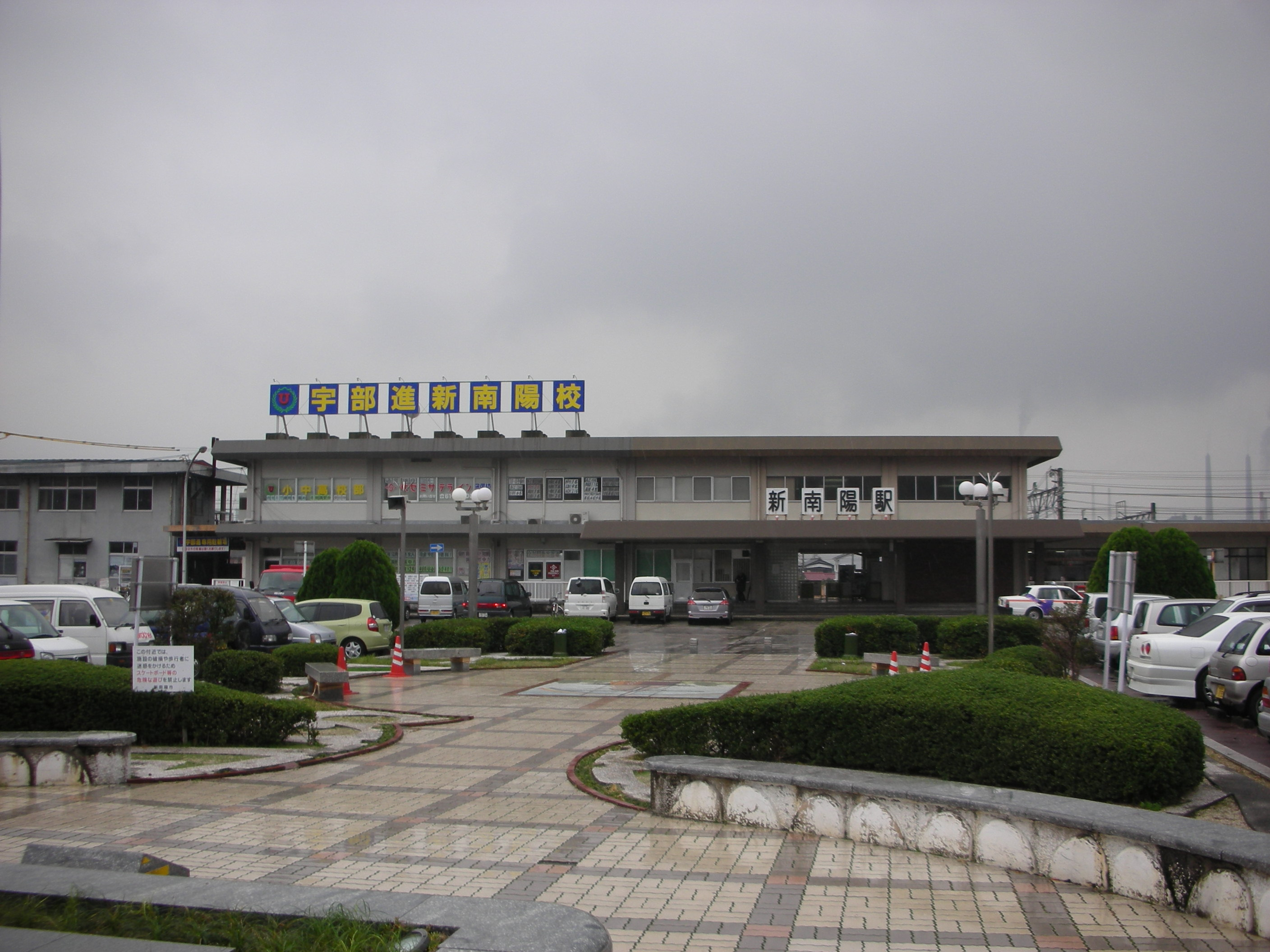
- Shinnan-yō Station in November 2006

General information
- Location: 2-chōme-16 Shimizu, Shūnan-shi, Yamaguchi-ken 746-0015; Japan
- Coordinates: 34°4′11.18″N 131°46′9.29″E
- Owner: West Japan Railway Company
- Operator: West Japan Railway Company Japan Freight Railway Company
- Line: San'yō Line
- Distance: 419.0 km (260.4 miles) from Kobe
- Platforms: 1 island platform
- Tracks: 3
- Connections: Bus stop

Construction
- Accessible: Yes

Other information
- Status: Unstaffed
- Website: Official website

History
- Opened: 18 April 1926; 100 years ago
- Former names: Suō-Tonda (to 1980)

Passengers
- FY2022: 1134

Services
Preceding station	JR West	Following station
Fukugawa towards Shimonoseki	San'yō Line Local	Tokuyama towards Iwakuni
Location
- Location within Yamaguchi Prefecture Location within Japan

Shinnan-yō Station (新南陽駅, Shinnan-yō-eki) is a passenger railway station located in the city of Shūnan, Yamaguchi Prefecture, Japan. It is operated by the West Japan Railway Company (JR West). It is also the location of a freight depot operated by the Japan Freight Railway Company (JR Freight).

== Lines ==
Shinnan-yō Station is served by the JR West Sanyō Main Line, and is located 419.0 kilometers from the terminus of the line at Kobe.

== Station layout ==
The station consists of one island platform connected to the station building by a footbridge. The station formerly also had a side platform, which accounts for the discrepancy in platform numbering. The station is unattended.

== Platforms ==
2	■ San'yō Line	for Tokuyama and Iwakuni
3	■ San'yō Line	for Hōfu, Shin-Yamaguchi and Shimonoseki

== History ==
Shinnan-yō Station was opened on 18 April 1926 as Suō-Tonda Station (周防富田駅). It was renamed on 1 October 1980. With the privatization of the Japan National Railway (JNR) on 1 April 1987, the station came under the aegis of the West Japan railway Company (JR West).

== Passenger statistics ==
In fiscal 2022, the station was used by an average of 1134 passengers daily.

== Surrounding area ==
- Shunan City Shinnanyo Public Hall
- Shunan City New Nanyo Gymnasium
- Shunan City Social Culture Hall
- Shunan Municipal Shinnanyo Municipal Hospital

== See also ==
- List of railway stations in Japan
