= Sweet viburnum =

Sweet viburnum is a common name for several plants and may refer to:

- Viburnum lentago, native to North America
- Viburnum odoratissimum, native to Asia
