= Shikiyama Castle =

- 敷山城
- Hōfu, Yamaguchi, Japan
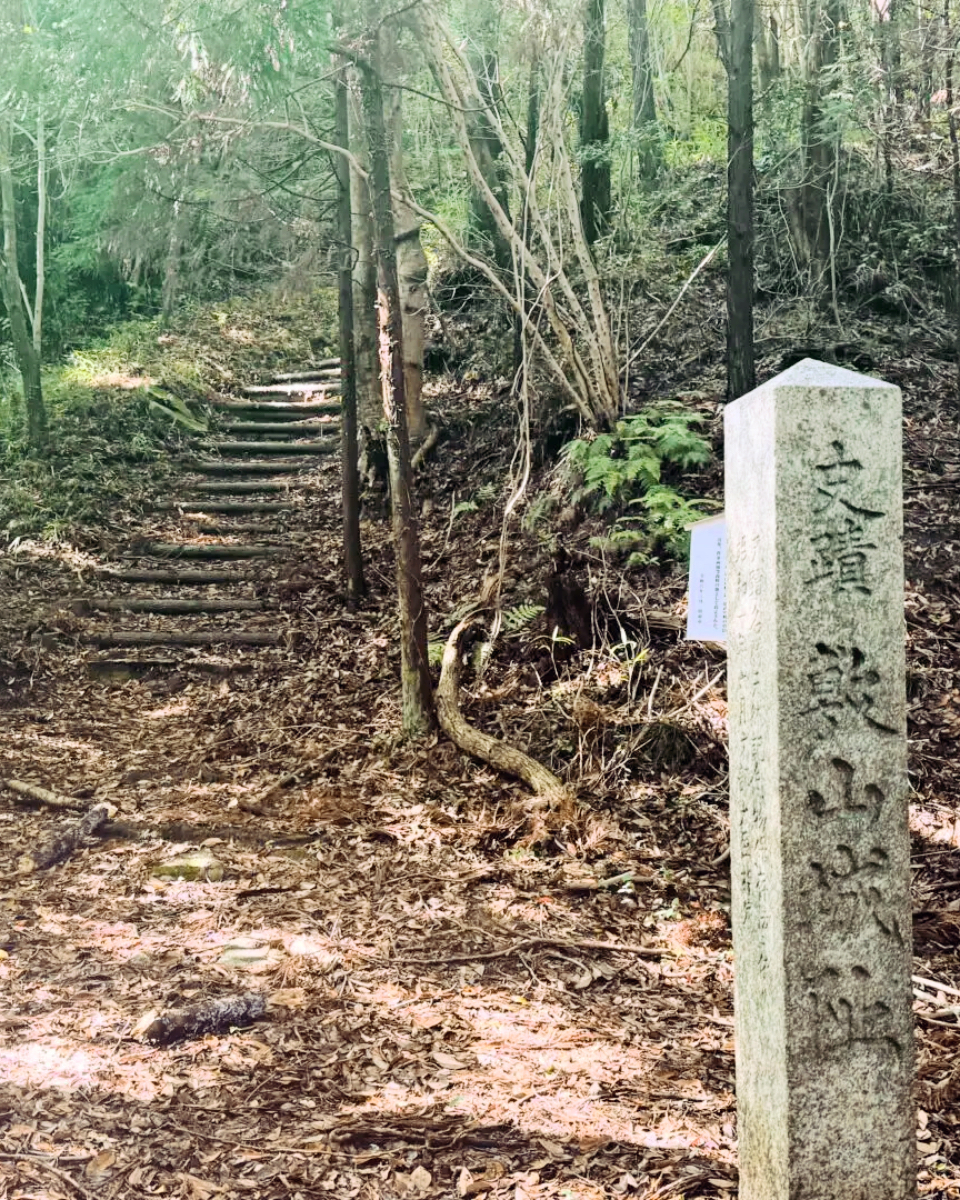

Site information
- Type: yamashiro-style Japanese castle
- Condition: ruins

Location
- Shikiyama Castle Shikiyama Castle (Japan)
- Coordinates: 34°04′56″N 131°35′43″E

Site history
- Built: c.1336
- Battles/wars: Battle of Shikiyama (1336)
- National Historic Site of Japan

Shikiyama Castle (敷山城, Shikiyama-jō) was a Nanboku-chō period yamajiro-style Japanese castle located in what is today the Mureshikiyama neighborhood of the city of Hōfu in Yamaguchi Prefecture. Its ruins have been protected by the central government as a National Historic Site since 1935.

== History ==
Shikiyama Castle is located on the left bank of the Sabagawa River, on the south side of Mount Yahazugatake (elevation 460 meters). The mountain was the location of a temple called Shikiyama Genkan-ji. In 1336, Ashikaga Takauji revolted against Emperor Go-Daigo's Kenmu Restoration, and supported a rival to the throne. In Suō Province, the acting governor mokudai Settsu Jokō Seison (摂津助公清尊) and acting vice governor Jōhōgan Kyōjō (助法眼教乗) raised an army in support of the Southern Court and fortified the temple as their stronghold, with the Main Hall serving as the castle's tenshu. Ashikaga Takauchi dispatched an army of troops from Aki, Nagato and Iwami Provinces led by Ueno Yorikane, the shugo of Iwami, which besieged the mountain for ten days. After a fierce battle, the castle fell, and both Seison and Kyōjō were forced to commit seppuku. This marked the beginning of the wars of the Nanboku-chō period in this region. Today, only a fragment of the foundation stones for the Main Hall remains.

== See also ==
- List of Historic Sites of Japan (Yamaguchi)

== Literature ==
- De Lange, William (2021). An Encyclopedia of Japanese Castles. Groningen: Toyo Press. pp. 600 pages. ISBN 978-9492722300.
- Sansom, George (1961). A History of Japan: 1334–1615. Stanford, California: Stanford University Press
- Turnbull, Stephen (1998). The Samurai Sourcebook. London: Cassell & Co.
