= Heta Station =

Railway station in Shūnan, Yamaguchi Prefecture, Japan

Heta Station 戸田駅
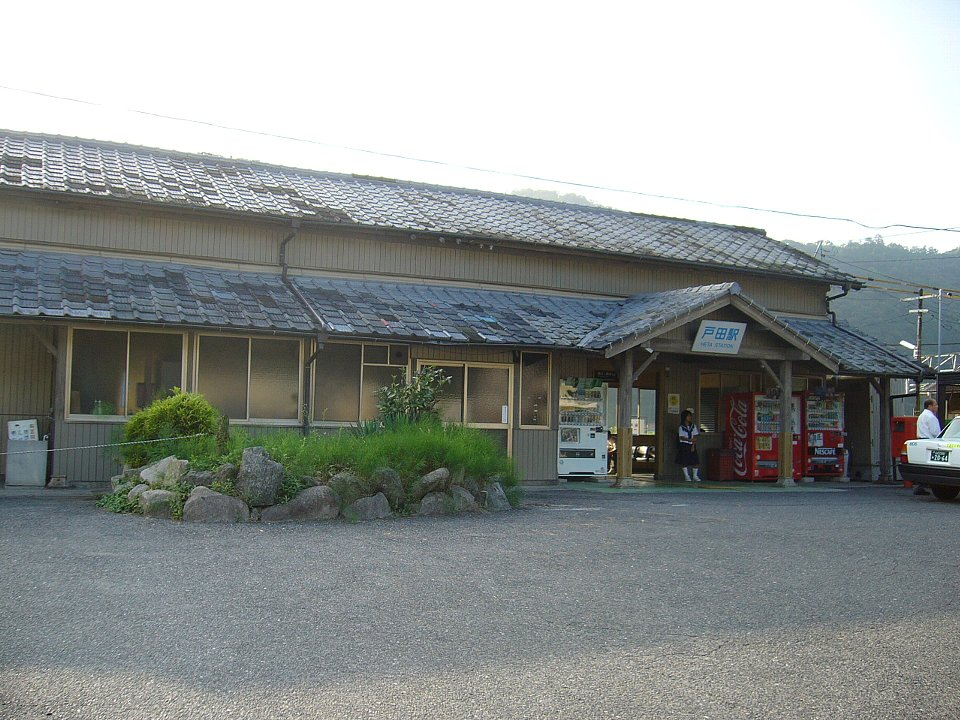
- Heta Station in August 2006

General information
- Location: Yaji Nakamura, Shūnan-shi, Yamaguchi-ken 746-0084; Japan
- Coordinates: 34°4′20.95″N 131°42′15.37″E
- Owner: West Japan Railway Company
- Operator: West Japan Railway Company
- Line: San'yō Line
- Distance: 425.7 km (264.5 miles) from Kobe
- Platforms: 1 side + 1 island platforms
- Tracks: 3
- Connections: Bus stop

Other information
- Status: Unstaffed
- Website: Official website

History
- Opened: 3 December 1911; 114 years ago

Passengers
- FY2022: 314

Services
Preceding station	JR West	Following station
Tonomi towards Shimonoseki	San'yō Line Local	Fukugawa towards Iwakuni
Location
- Location within Yamaguchi Prefecture Location within Japan

Heta Station (戸田駅, Heta-eki) is a passenger railway station located in the city of Shūnan, Yamaguchi Prefecture, Japan. It is operated by the West Japan Railway Company (JR West).

== Lines ==
Heta Station is served by the JR West Sanyō Main Line, and is located 425.7 kilometers from the terminus of the line at Kobe.

== Station layout ==
The station consists of one side platform and one island platform connected by a footbridge. The station is staffed.

== Platforms ==
1, 2	■ San'yō Line	for Tokuyama and Iwakuni
3	■ San'yō Line	for Hōfu, Shin-Yamaguchi and Shimonoseki

== History ==
Heta Station was opened on 3 December 1911 as a station on the San'yo Railway. The San'yo Railway was railway nationalized in 1906 and the line renamed the San'yo Main Line in 1909. With the privatization of the Japan National Railway (JNR) on 1 April 1987, the station came under the aegis of the West Japan railway Company (JR West).

== Passenger statistics ==
In fiscal 2022, the station was used by an average of 314 passengers daily.

== Surrounding area ==
- Sanyo Expressway
- Japan National Route 2
- Shunan Municipal Toda Elementary School
- Shunan City Night Market Elementary School
- Shunan Municipal Sakurada Junior High School

== See also ==
- List of railway stations in Japan
