= Yotsutsuji Station =

Railway station in Yamaguchi, Yamaguchi Prefecture, Japan

Yotsutsuji Station 四辻駅
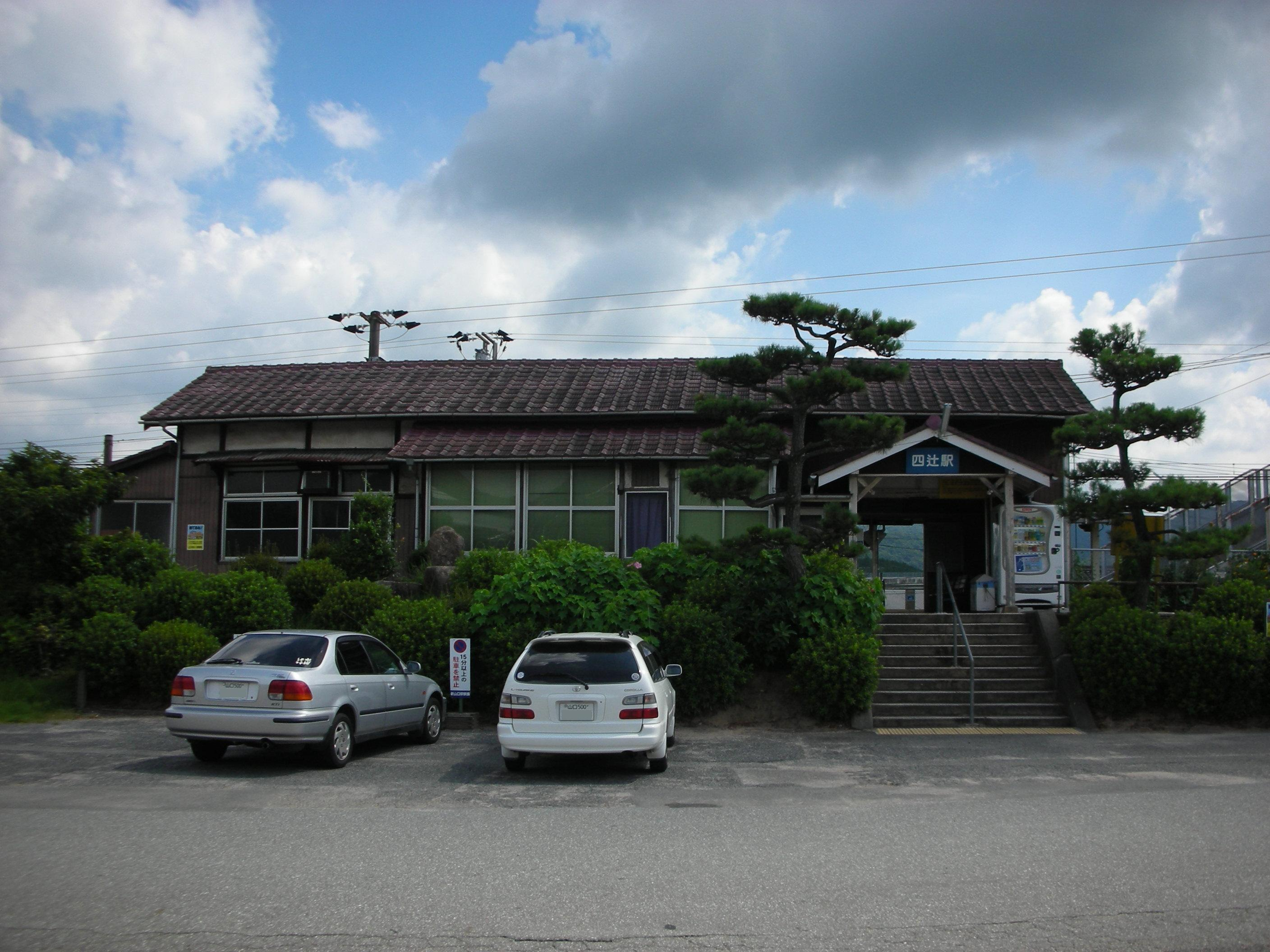
- Yotsutsuji Station in July 2008

General information
- Location: 5716 Suzenji, Yamaguchi-shi, Yamaguchi-ken, 747-1221; Japan
- Coordinates: 34°4′47.6″N 131°26′52.52″E
- Owner: West Japan Railway Company
- Operator: West Japan Railway Company
- Line: San'yō Line
- Distance: 454.0 km (282.1 miles) from Kobe
- Platforms: 1 side + 1 island platform
- Tracks: 3
- Connections: Bus stop

Other information
- Status: Unstaffed
- Website: Official website

History
- Opened: 16 May 1920; 106 years ago

Passengers
- FY2022: 283

Services
Preceding station	JR West	Following station
Shin-Yamaguchi towards Shimonoseki	San'yō Line Local	Daidō towards Iwakuni
Location
- Location within Yamaguchi Prefecture Location within Japan

Yotsutsuji Station (四辻駅, Yotsutsuji-eki) is a passenger railway station located in the city of Yamaguchi, Yamaguchi Prefecture, Japan. It is operated by the West Japan Railway Company (JR West).

== Lines ==
Yotsutsuji Station is served by the JR West San'yō Main Line, and is located 450 kilometres (280 mi) from the terminus of the line at Kobe.

== Station layout ==
The station consists of one side platform and one island platform connected by a footbridge; however, the middle track is no longer in operation. The station is unattended.

== Platforms ==
1	■ San'yō Line	for Shin-Yamaguchi and Shimonoseki
2	■ San'yō Line	not in operation
3	■ San'yō Line	for Hōfu, Tokuyama and Iwakuni

== History ==
Yotsutsuji Station was opened on 16 May 1920. With the privatization of the Japan National Railway (JNR) on 1 April 1987, the station came under the aegis of the West Japan Railway Company (JR West).

== Passenger statistics ==
In fiscal 2022, the station was used by an average of 283 passengers daily.

== Surrounding area ==
- Sanyo Expressway Yamaguchi south IC
- Japan National Route 2
- Yamaguchi Municipal Chusenji Elementary School

== See also ==
- List of railway stations in Japan
