= Tonomi Station =

Railway station in Hōfu, Yamaguchi Prefecture, Japan

Tonomi Station 富海駅
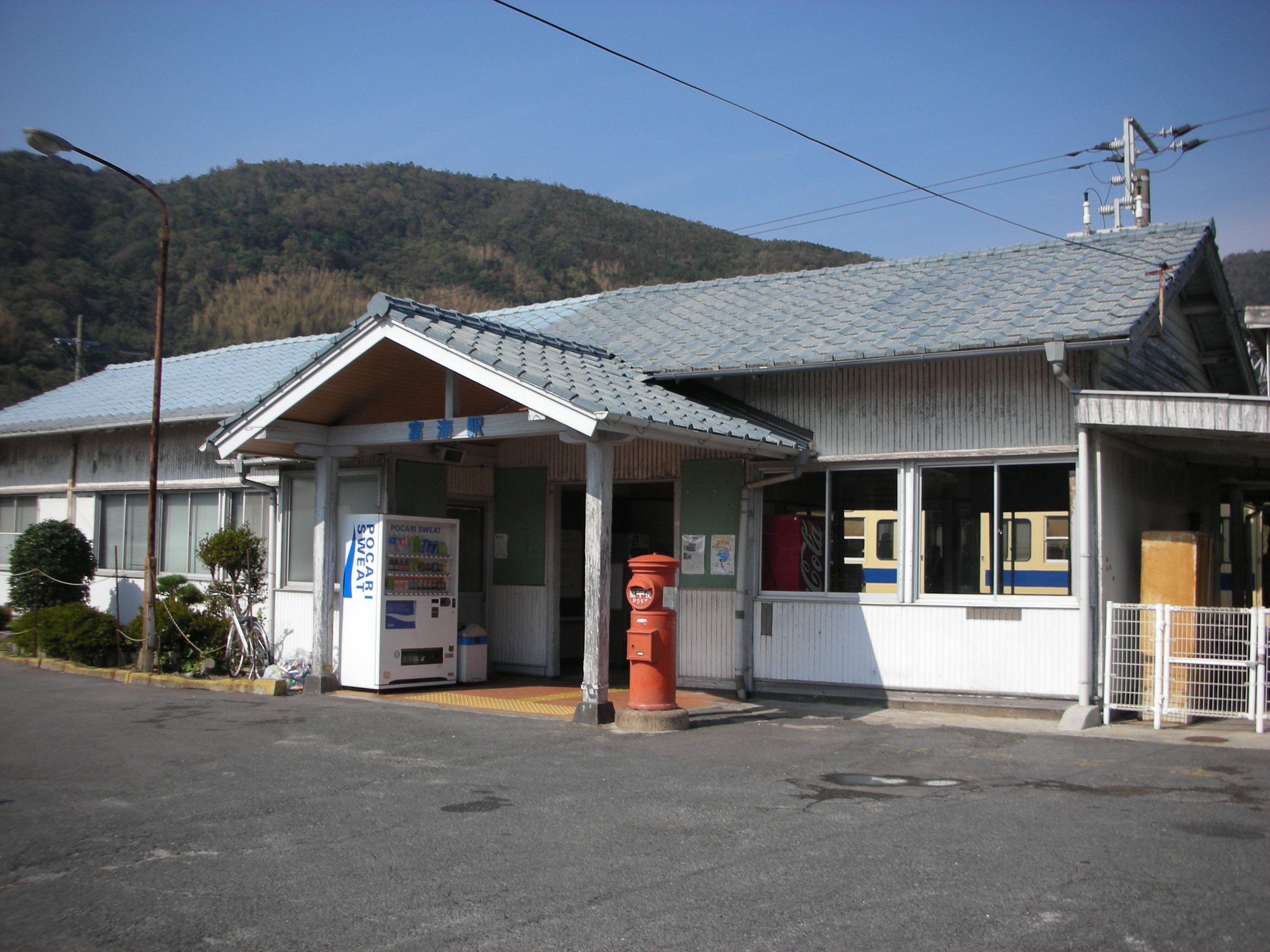
- Tonomi Station in November 2006

General information
- Location: 1990 Tonomi, Hōfu-shi, Yamaguchi-ken 747-1111; Japan
- Coordinates: 34°2′54.63″N 131°38′20.35″E
- Owner: West Japan Railway Company
- Operator: West Japan Railway Company
- Line: San'yō Line
- Distance: 434.2 km (269.8 miles) from Kobe
- Platforms: 2 side platforms
- Tracks: 3
- Connections: Bus stop

Construction
- Accessible: Yes

Other information
- Status: Unstaffed
- Website: Official website

History
- Opened: 17 March 1897; 129 years ago

Passengers
- FY2022: 153

Services
| Preceding station | JR West | Following station |
|---|---|---|
| Hōfu towards Shimonoseki | San'yō Line Local | Heta towards Iwakuni |
Location
- Location within Yamaguchi Prefecture Location within Japan

Tonomi Station (富海駅, Tonomi-eki) is a passenger railway station located in the city of Hōfu, Yamaguchi Prefecture, Japan. It is operated by the West Japan Railway Company (JR West).

== Lines ==
Tonomi Station is served by the JR West Sanyō Main Line and is 434.2 kilometers from the terminus of the line at Kobe.

== Station layout ==
The station consists of two opposed side platforms connected by a footbridge. A through traffic track runs in between the two platforms. It is unattended to.

== Platforms ==
| 1 | ■ San'yō Line | for Hōfu, Shin-Yamaguchi and Shimonoseki |
| 3 | ■ San'yō Line | for Tokuyama and Iwakuni |

== History ==
Tonomi Station was opened on 17 March 1898 as a station on the San'yo Railway when the line was extended from Tokuyama to Mitajiri (present-day Hōfu Station). The San'yo Railway was nationalized in 1906, and the line was renamed the San'yo Main Line in 1909. With the privatization of the Japan National Railway (JNR) on 1 April 1987, the station came under the aegis of the West Japan Railway Company (JR West).

== Passenger statistics ==
In fiscal 2022, the station was used by an average of 153 passengers daily.

== Surrounding area ==
- Japan National Route 2
- Hofu Municipal Tomi Junior High School
- Hofu Municipal Tomi Elementary School
- Hofu Kasuga Shrine

== See also ==
- List of railway stations in Japan
