= Saba River (Japan) =

Sabagawa River
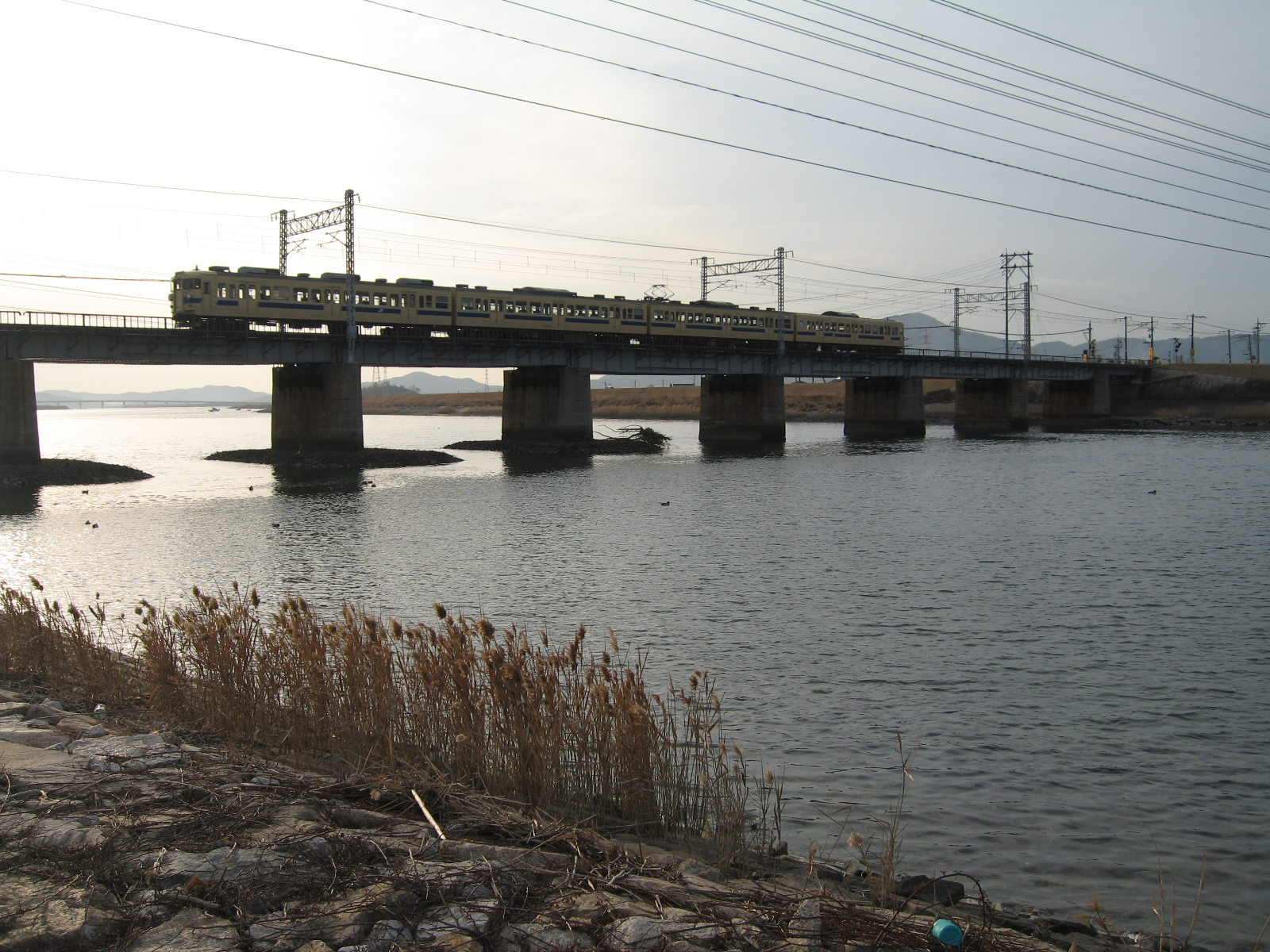
- Saba River in Hōfu, Yamaguchi

- Location within Japan
- Native name: 佐波川 (Japanese)

Location
- Country: Japan

Physical characteristics
- Source
  - location: Suō Mountains, Yamaguchi Prefecture
  - elevation: 969 m (3,179 ft)
- Mouth: Hōfu, Yamaguchi
  - location: Seto Inland Sea
  - coordinates: 34°01′45″N 131°29′22″E
  - elevation: 0 m (0 ft)
- Length: 57 km (35 mi)
- Basin size: 423 km^{2} (163 sq mi)
- Discharge
  - average: 68.3 m^{3}/s (2,410 cu ft/s)
- National Historic Site Saba River (Japan) (Yamaguchi Prefecture) Saba River (Japan) (Japan)

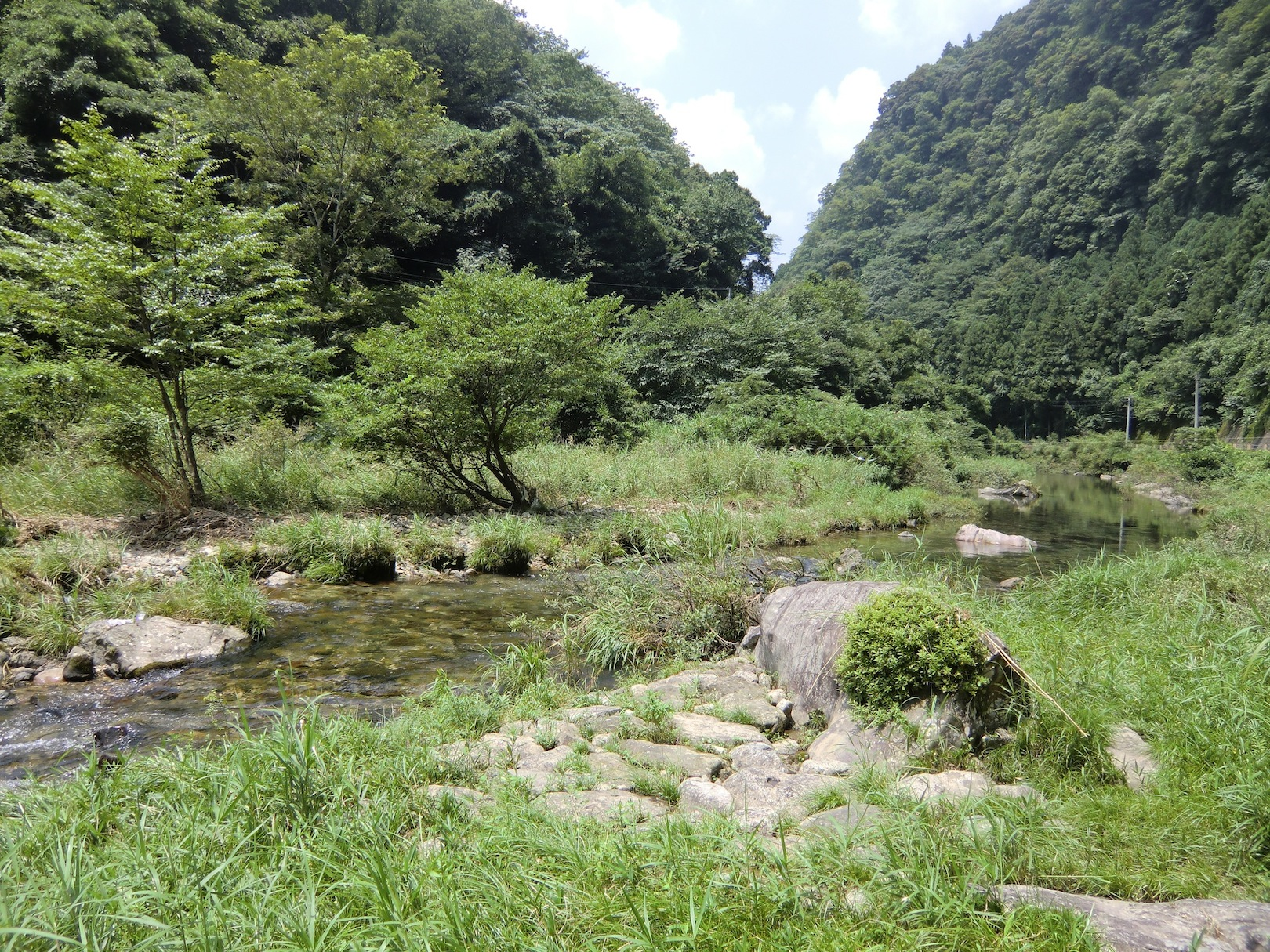
Sabagawa Sekimizu ruins in Yamaguchi city

The Saba River (佐波川, Sabagawa) is a Class A river located in central Yamaguchi Prefecture, in the San'yō region of western Honshū in Japan. It is also written as "鯖川".

== Overview ==
The Saba River is 57 kilometres (35 mi) long and has a watershed of 423 square kilometres (163 sq mi). It rises from Mikamine in the Suō Mountains located on the border of Shimane Prefecture, flows further south through Lake Ohara (Sabagawa Dam), crosses the Chūgoku Expressway, turns to the southwest, crosses the northwestern part of Hōfu city, and then flows into the Suō Sea of the Seto Inland Sea. Local governments in the watershed are Hōfu City, Yamaguchi City, and Shūnan City.

== Origin of the name ==
During the early Kamakura period, the Kamakura shogunate earmarked the revenues of Suō Province for use in rebuilding the great national temple of Tōdai-ji in Nara, which had been destroyed during the Genpei War. Tōdai-ji dispatched the noted monk Chōgen in 1186 to raise funds and to procure the necessary timber and other raw materials from the mountains of Saba District in Suō.According to legend, when Chōgen overhear some of the workers complaining that they had not eaten any fish since they left Yamato, he wrote a magical pray on a piece of scrap wood, which turned into a mackerel ("saba") when he tossed it in the river.

== Sabagawa Sekimizu ==
Since ancient times, the Saba River was prone to flooding. Chōgen is recorded to have constructed 118 weirs along its course to control flooding and to facilitate the transport of lumber. All have been destroyed over time through neglect, flooding and typhoon damage, and only the ruins of the first and second weirs located at the Tukuji Funaji neighborhood of Yamaguchi City remain. This weir raised the water level via a shallow dam, and had an opening with a width of approximately 5.4 metres (18 ft) to create a long and narrow waterway for timber flow, with flat stones on the bottom of the river to enable the logs to slide easier. It was designated a National Historic Site of Japan in 1937 as the Sabagawa Sekimizu (佐波川関水).

== Notani Stone Bath ==
Another physical remnant of Chōgen's time along this river is the Notani Stone Bath (野谷石風呂, Notani ishiburo), located about 1.8 kilometres (1.1 mi) north of the Sabagawa Sekimizu in the Tokuji neighborhood of the city of Yamaguchi, Yamaguchi Prefecture. An ishiburo is a steam bath in which water is poured over heated stones to create a sauna. Chōgen constructed a number of these facilities in order to treat sicknesses and injuries of people engaged in work such as logging and transporting lumber. The Notani facility is the one of many which were once located along the Saba River at the time, and is situated on the south bank of the Shikotani River, a tributary of the Saba River. It consists of a cliff in which a rectangular area 0.9 metres (2 ft 11 in) high and 0.6 metres (2 ft 0 in) wide and two metres (6 ft 7 in) deep has been carved out. It was designated a National Historic Site of Japan in 1935.

== See also ==
- List of Historic Sites of Japan (Yamaguchi)
