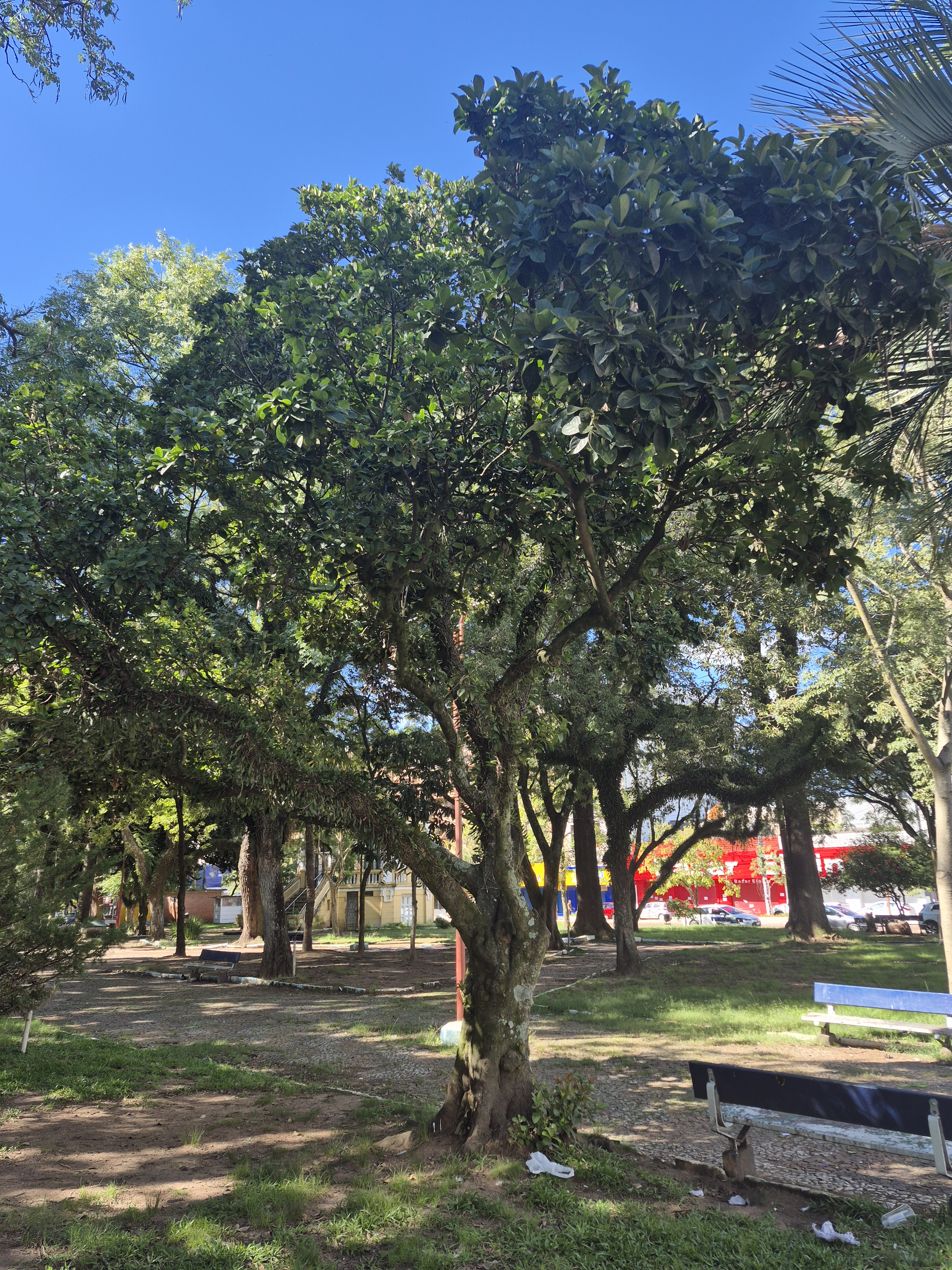
- Habit (cultivated in Brazil)
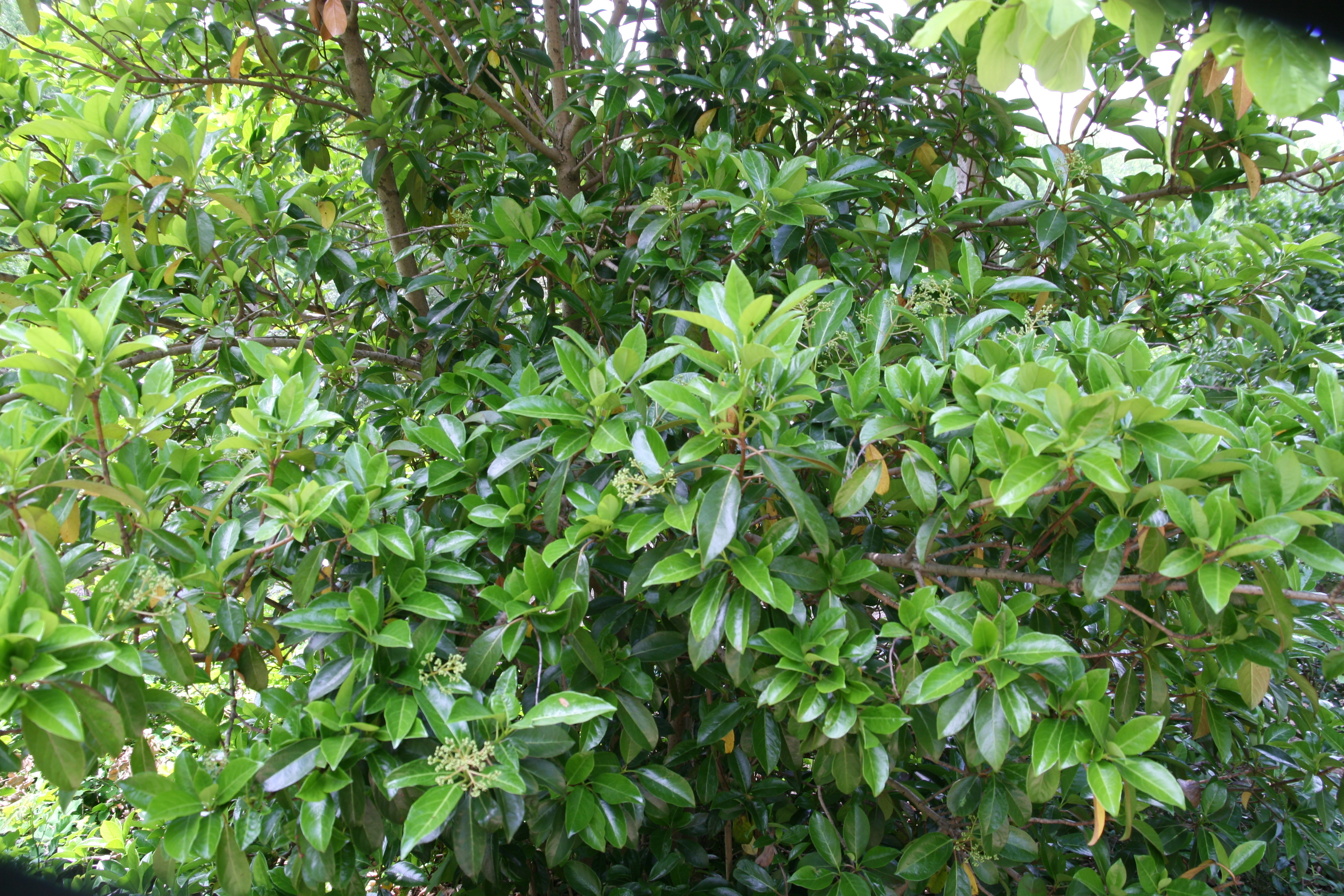
- Viburnum odoratissimum var. awabuki

Scientific classification
- Kingdom: Plantae
- Clade: Tracheophytes
- Clade: Angiosperms
- Clade: Eudicots
- Clade: Asterids
- Order: Dipsacales
- Family: Viburnaceae
- Genus: Viburnum
- Species: V. odoratissimum

Binomial name
- Viburnum odoratissimum Ker Gawl.

= Viburnum odoratissimum =

Species of shrub

Viburnum odoratissimum, the sweet viburnum, is a shrub or small tree in the family Viburnaceae. It is native to Asia, and commonly cultivated as a garden ornamental elsewhere.

== Description ==
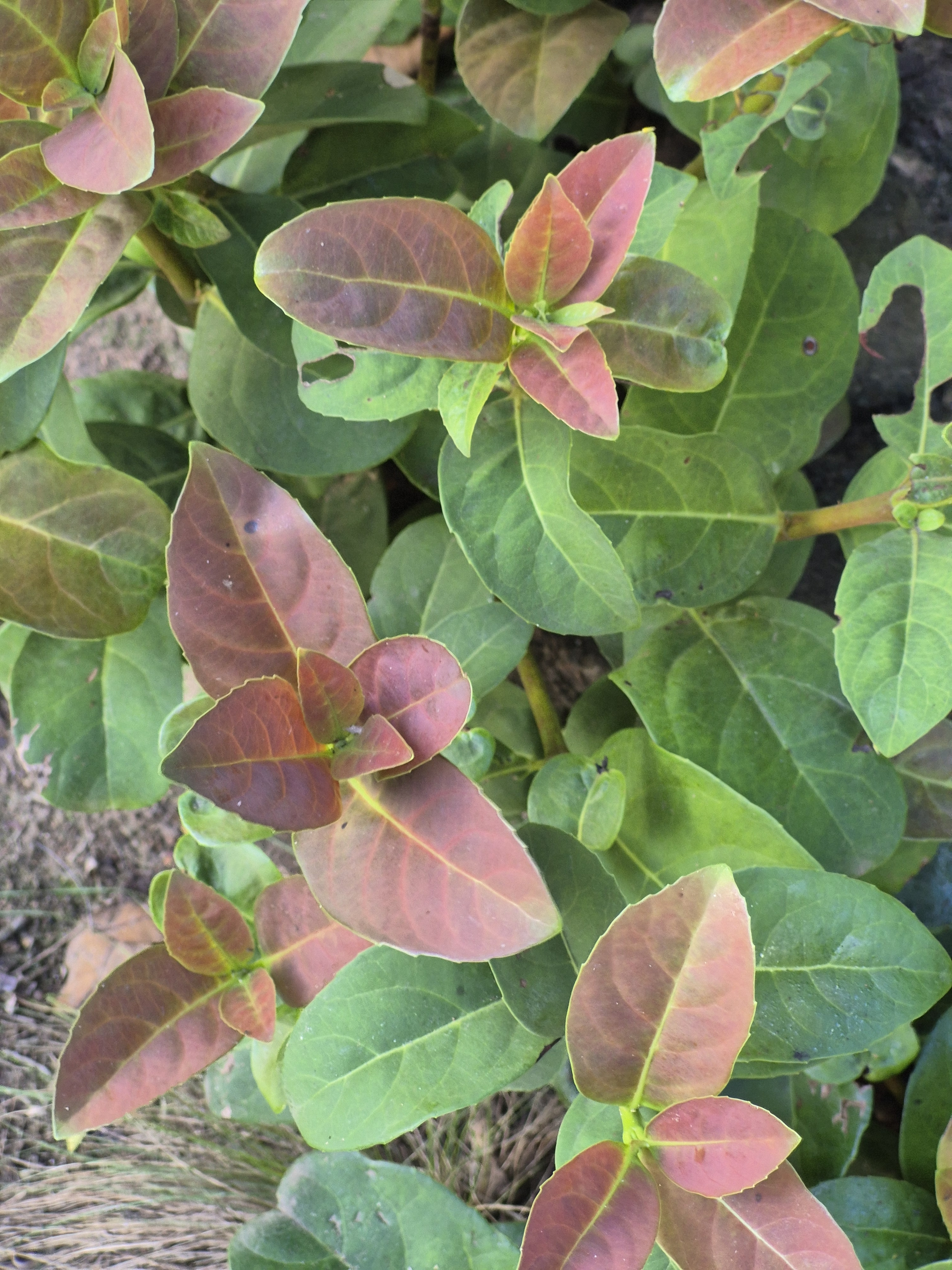
Young leaves growing from the bottom of the trunk, in Brazil

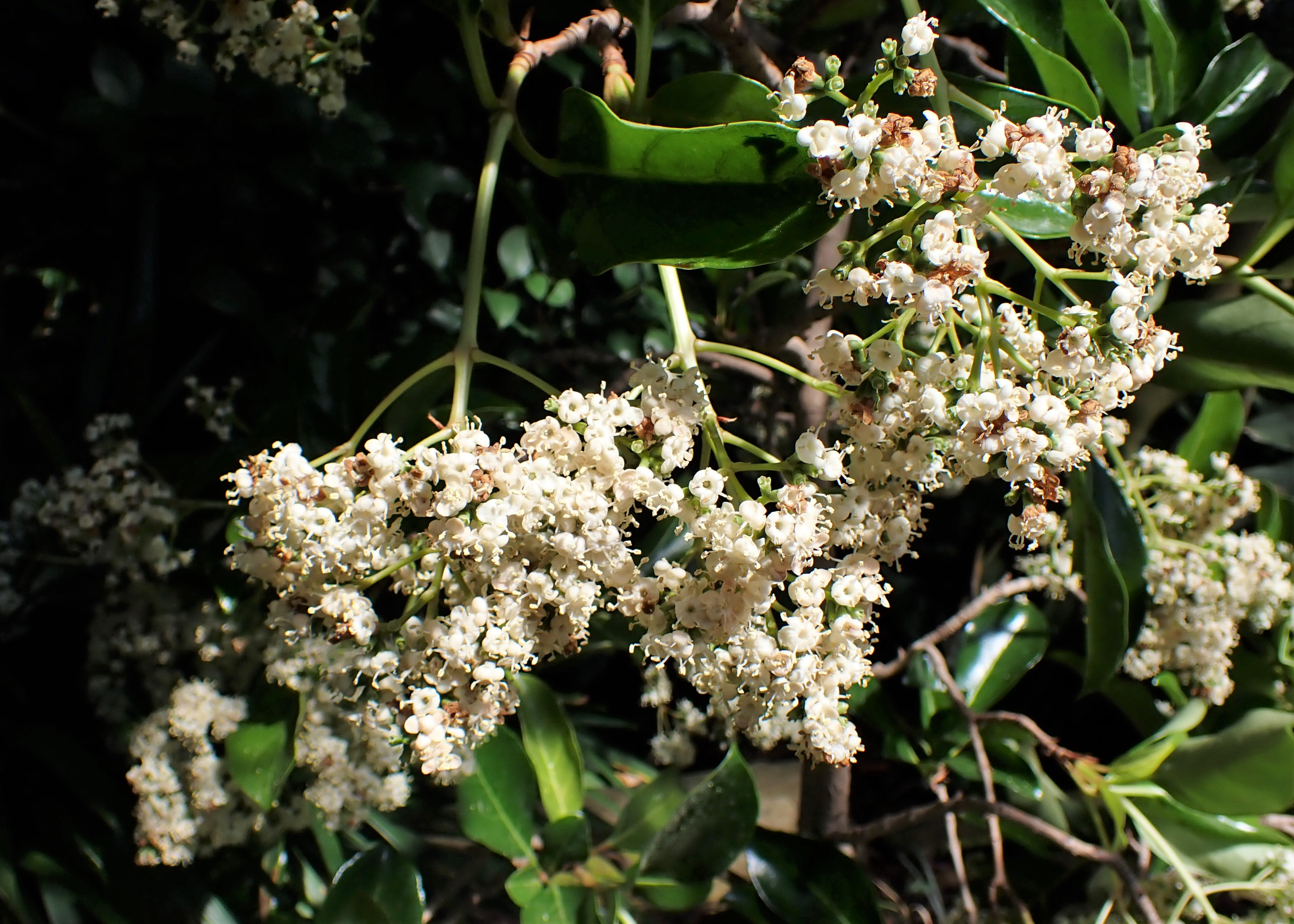
Flowers

It grows to 9 metres high and has dull elliptical leaves to 20 cm long. In spring it produces pyramid-shaped clusters of fragrant white flowers, followed by red berries that age to black.

== Distribution and habitat ==
The species is native to China, Korea, Taiwan, Japan, the Himalayan region in India, Myanmar, Thailand, Vietnam and the Philippines.

Viburnum odoratissimum var. awabuki, now considered by some authorities to be its own species, Viburnum awabuki, and with glossy leaves, is native to Korea (Jeju Island), Taiwan, and Japan.

== Cultivation ==
The species prefers warm, frost-free climates.
