= Suō Kokubun-ji =

Buddhist temple in Hōfu, Japan

Suō Kokubun-ji 周防国分寺
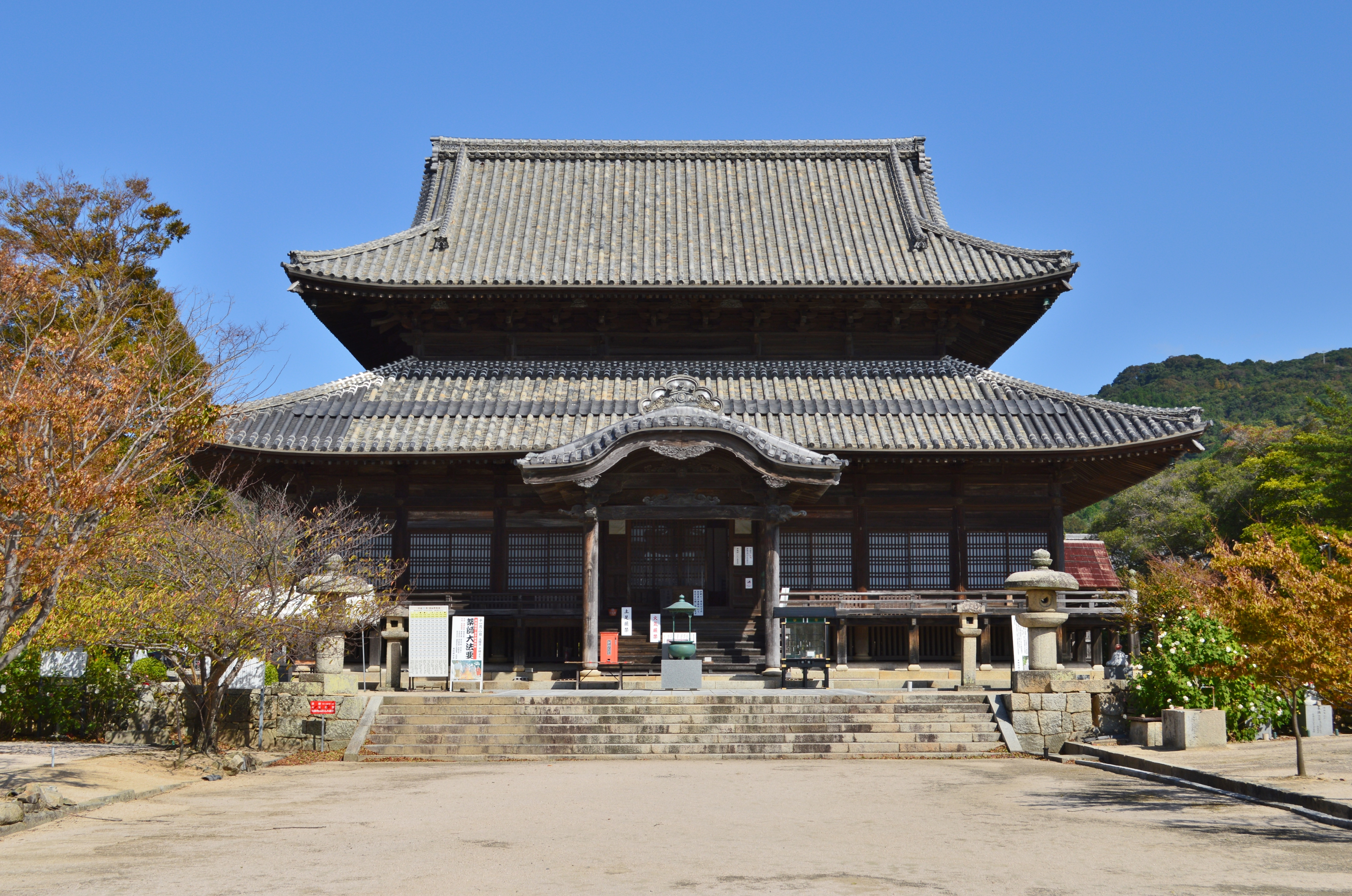
- Suō Kokubun-ji Kondō

- Suō Kokubun-ji Suō Kokubun-ji (Japan)

Religion
- Affiliation: Buddhist
- Deity: Yakushi Nyōrai
- Rite: Kōyasan Shingon-shū

Location
- Location: 2-67 Kokubunjichō, Hōfu-shi, Yamaguchi-ken
- Country: Japan
- Coordinates: 34°3′43.47″N 131°34′45.80″E

Architecture
- Founder: Emperor Shōmu
- Completed: c.747

Website
- Official website
- National Historic Site of Japan

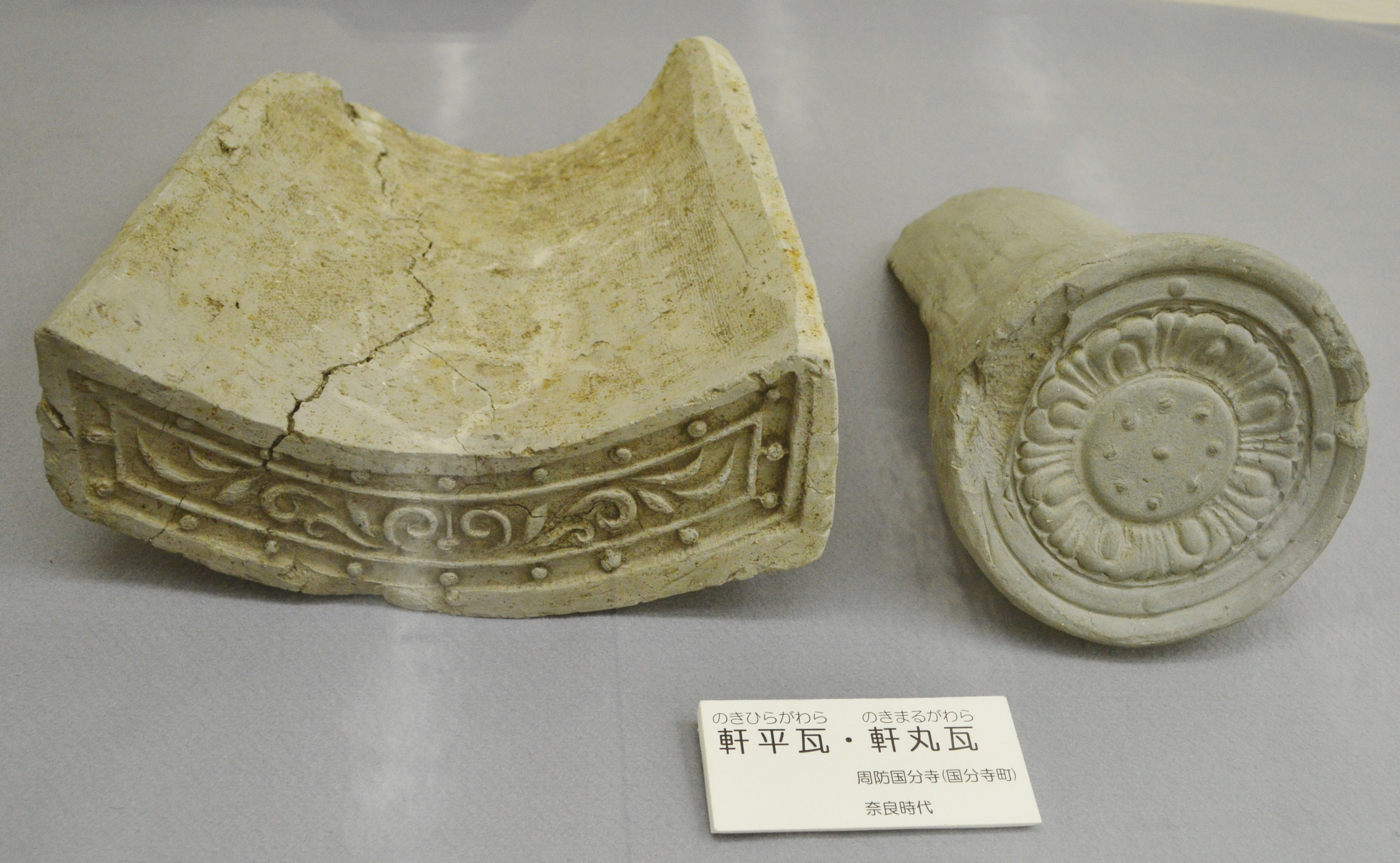
Roof tiles from Suō Kokubun-ji ruins

Suō Kokubun-ji (周防国分寺) is a Shingon-sect Buddhist temple in the Kokubunji neighborhood of the city of Hōfu, Yamaguchi, Japan. It belongs to the Kōyasan Shingon-shū sect and its honzon is a statue of Yakushi Nyorai. It is one of the few surviving provincial temples established by Emperor Shōmu during the Nara period (710 – 794). Due to this connection, the foundation stones of the Nara period temple overlapping the present day complex were designated as a National Historic Site in 1957.

== History ==
The Shoku Nihongi records that in 741, as the country recovered from a major smallpox epidemic, Emperor Shōmu ordered that a monastery and nunnery be established in every province, the kokubunji (国分寺). These temples were built to a semi-standardized template, and served both to spread Buddhist orthodoxy to the provinces, and to emphasize the power of the Nara period centralized government under the Ritsuryō system.

The Suō Kokubun-ji is located at the southern foot of Mount Tatara in the eastern part of the Hōfu Plain in southern Yamaguchi Prefecture. The location was near the kokufu or provincial capital of Suō Province, and the route of the ancient Sanyōdō highway, which connected the Kinai region with Kyushu passed east–west in front of the temple's South Gate. The exact date of the temple's foundation is unknown; but per Edo period records it was completed by 747 AD. It is listed in the Nara period Tenpyō Shōhō of 756, so it is certain to have been completed by the 750s. The original temple declined in the middle Heian period with the decline of the power and influence of the Imperial Court, but at the beginning of the Kamakura period, the revenues of Suō Province were assigned to the rebuilding of the great temple of Tōdai-ji and the monk Chōgen came to supervise its reconstruction. At the end of the Kamakura period, it was donated to Saidai-ji and was extensively reconstructed in 1325. During the Muromachi period, the temple came under the protection of the shugo of Suō, the Ōuchi clan, who granted it estates for its upkeep. In 1417, it was completely destroyed by fire, and was soon rebuilt. It is believed that the honzon of the current temple, a statue of Yakushi Nyōrai dates from this reconstruction. After the fall of the Ōuchi clan, the Mōri clan took over as protectors of the temple. The current Main Hall of the temple was reconstructed or rebuilt by the Mōri in 1779 or 1780. During a large-scale conservation repair from 1997 to 2004, archaeological excavations found that the Main Hall is built on foundation stones reused from the original Nara period structure. This is a unique example of a kokubunji temple which has not only survived to the present day, but has a Main Hall of the same size and on the same location as the original construction.

During earlier archaeological excavations conducted from 1953 to 1955 and 1980–1990, the foundations of a Five-story pagoda, middle gate, south gate, and back gate, and cloister have been discovered, but there is still much unknown about the layout of the temple and the extent of its original grounds. Numerous roof tiles have also been recovered from the site.

== Cultural Properties ==
=== Important Cultural Properties ===
- Suō Kokubunji Kondō (structure); built 1779, designated a national Important Cultural Property of Japan (ICP) in 1966.
- Amida Nyorai (sculpture, wooden, seated image); late Heian period, height 113.4 cm, designated an ICP in 1944
- Nikko Bosatsu (sculpture, cypress wood, standing image); late Heian period, height 180 cm, designated an ICP in 1944
- Gakko Bosatsu (sculpture, cypress wood, standing image); late Heian period, height 179 cm, designated an ICP in 1944
- Shi-Tenno (sculpture, wooden, standing images, set of four); late Heian period, height 203 to 213.5 cm, designated an ICP in 1944
- Yakushi Nyorai (sculpture, wooden, standing image); Muromachi period, height 199 cm, designated an ICP in 1944. Contains inside a hand, which is said to be the only surviving portion of the original Nara period statue.
- Heart Sutra (scroll, gold on dark blue paper); Muromachi period, height 199 cm, designated an ICP in 1910. Calligraphy by Emperor Go-Nara.

=== Yamaguchi Prefectural Tangible Cultural Properties ===
- Rōmon gate, dated 1596
- Yakushi Nyorai (sculpture, wooden, seated image), Muromachi period.
- Heart Sutra, gold and silver, handwritten by cloistered Emperor Go-Nara, Muromachi period
- Colored silk painting of Buddha's nirvana, Muromachi period
- Colored silk painting of Kumano mandala, Kamakura period
- Amida Nyorai (sculpture, wooden, standing image), Kamakura period.
- Dainichi Nyorai (sculpture, gilt bronze, seated image), 13th century, Goryeo
- Newborn Buddha (sculpture, gilt bronze, standing image), 9th century
- Suo-Kokubunji ancient documents, Muromachi to Meiji period

== See also ==
- List of Historic Sites of Japan (Yamaguchi)
- provincial temple
