= Yamaguchi Junior College =

College in Japan

Coordinates: 34°03′04″N 131°29′38″E

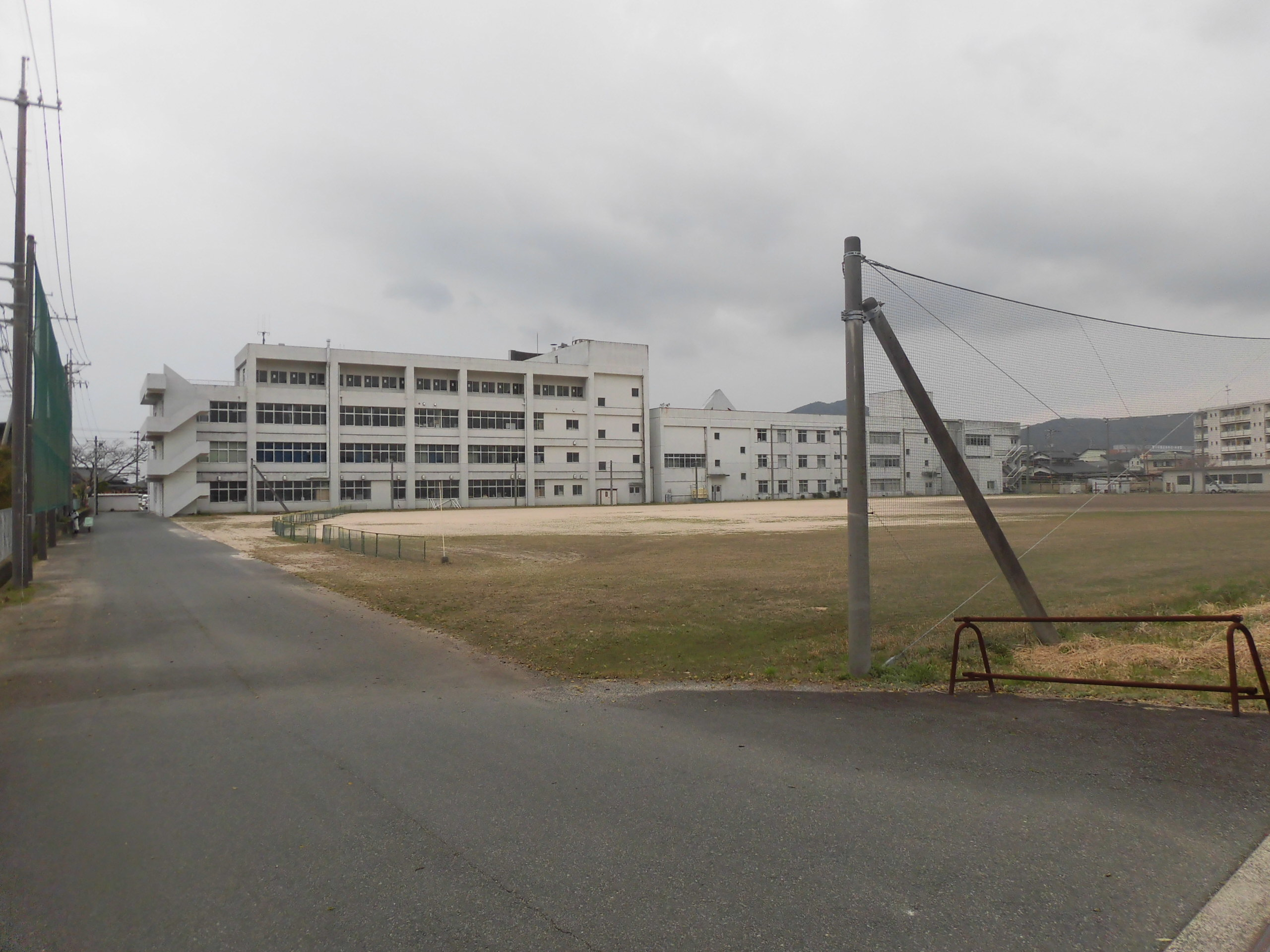
Yamaguchi Junior College

Yamaguchi Junior College (山口短期大学, Yamaguchi tanki daigaku) is a private junior college in Hōfu, Yamaguchi, Japan, established in 1967.
