= Hōfu =

Hōfu 防府市
- City
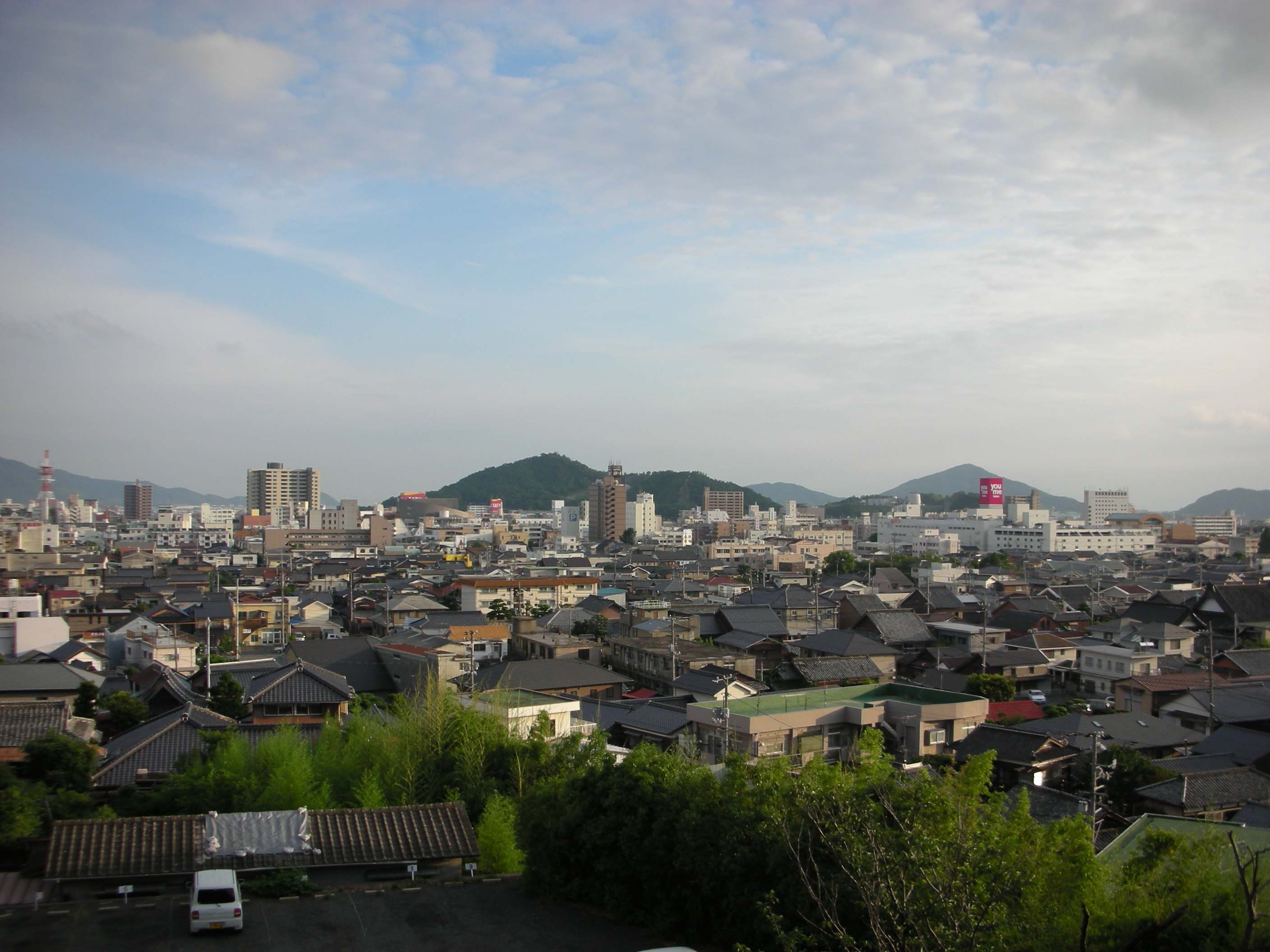
- Hofu city seen from Hōfu Tenman-gū shrine.

- Flag Emblem
- Interactive map of Hōfu
- Location in Japan
- Coordinates: 34°3′5″N 131°33′45″E
- Country: Japan
- Region: Chūgoku (San'yō)
- Prefecture: Yamaguchi

Government
  - Mayor: Yutaka Ikeda

Area
  - Total: 189.37 km^{2} (73.12 sq mi)

Population (May 31, 2023)
  - Total: 114,846
  - Density: 606.46/km^{2} (1,570.7/sq mi)
- Time zone: UTC+09:00 (JST)
- City hall address: 7-1, Kotobukichō, Hōfu-shi, Yamaguchi-ken 747-8501
- Climate: Cfa
- Website: Official website
- Symbols
- Flower: Scarlet sage
- Tree: Sangoju (Viburnum odoratissimum var. awabuki)

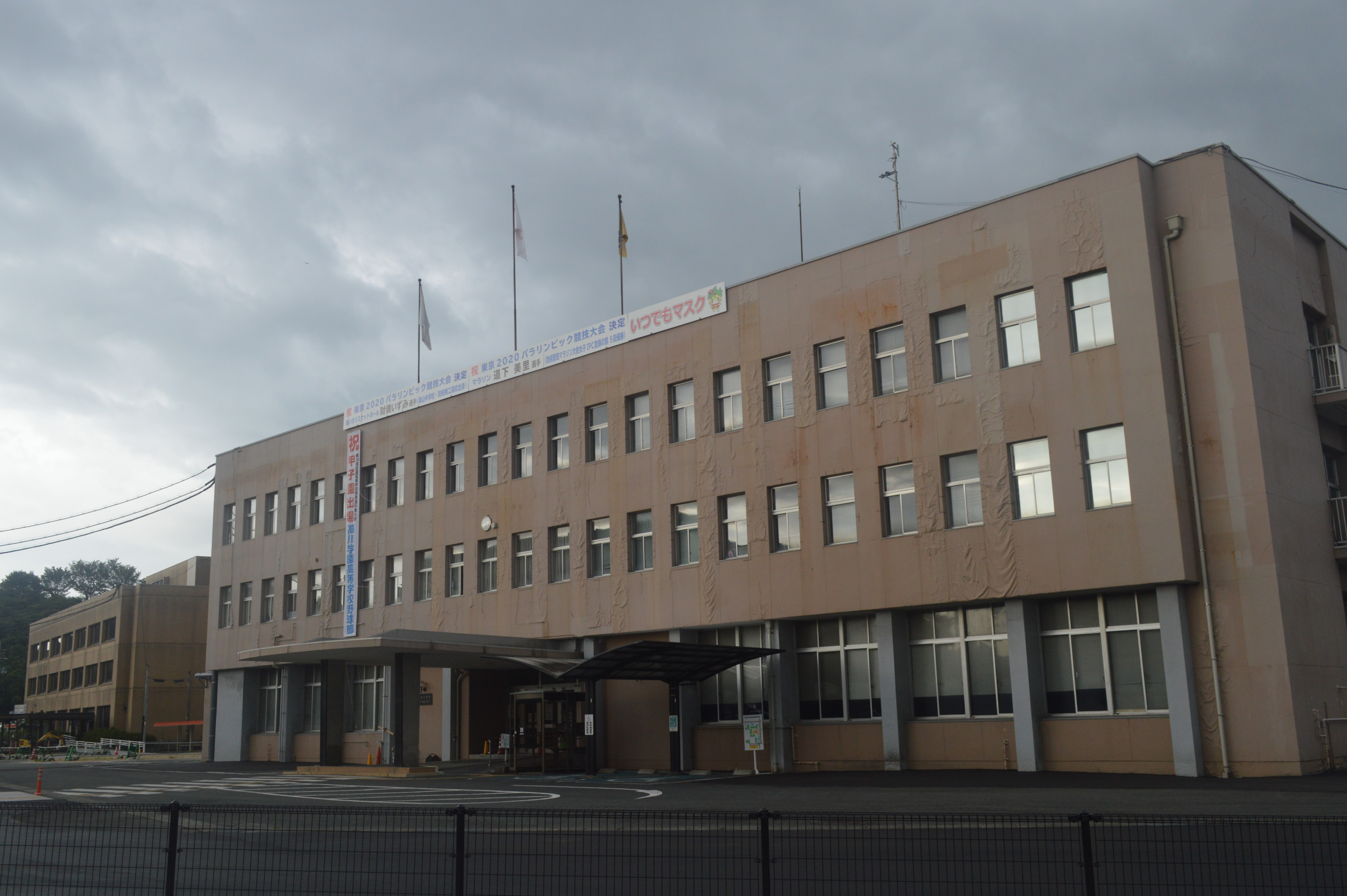
Hōfu City Hall

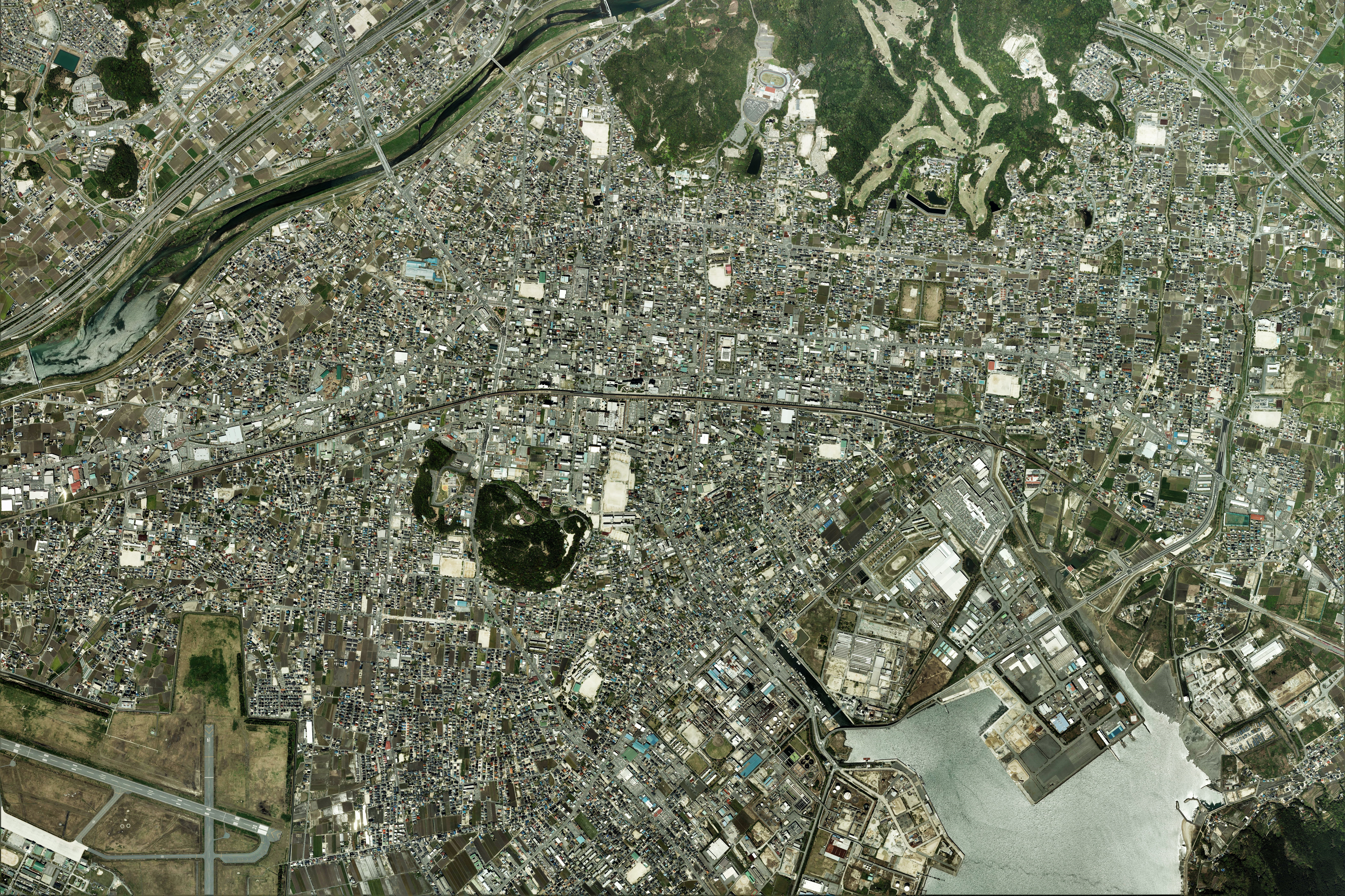
Aerial photograph of central Hōfu

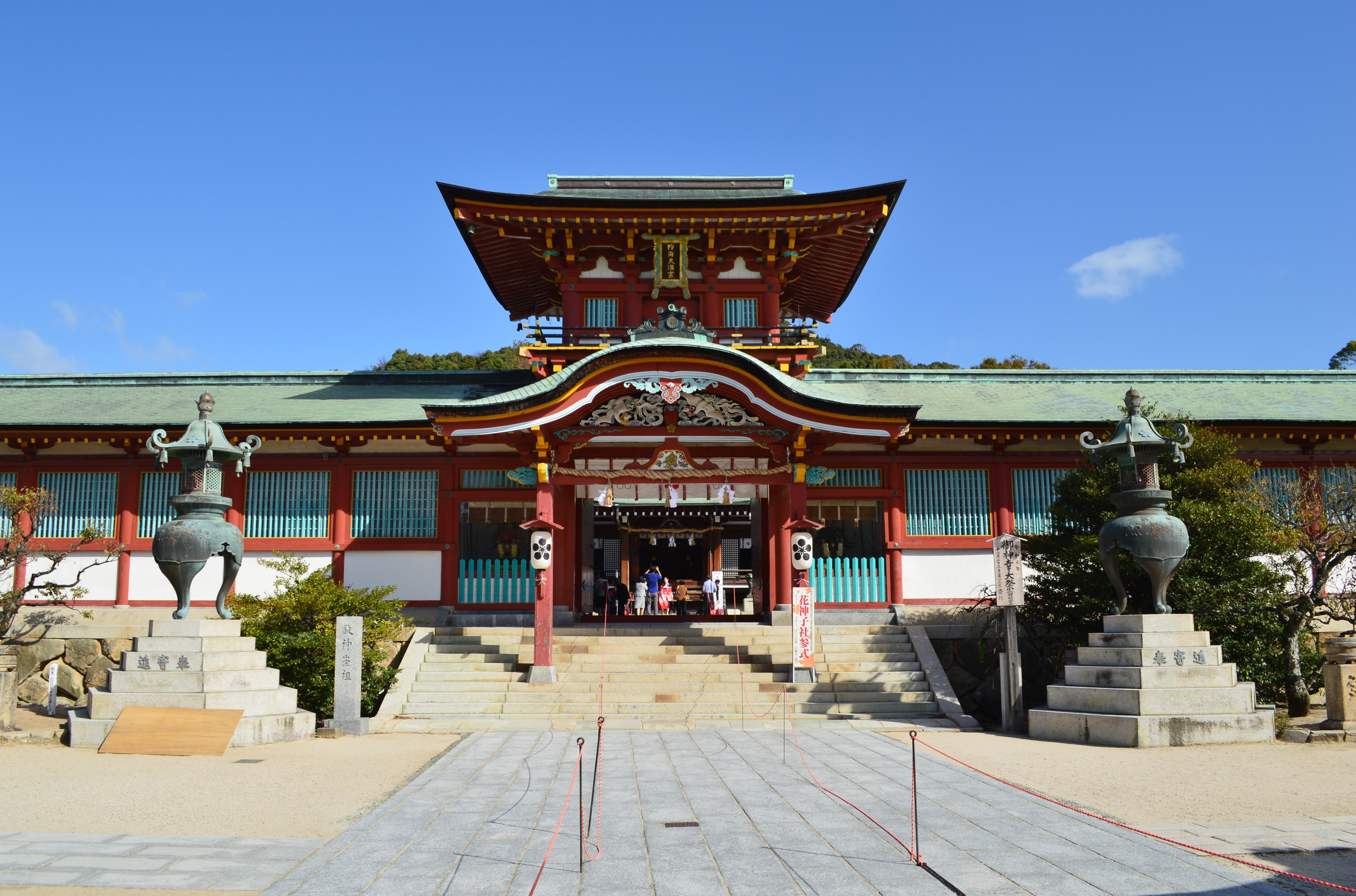
Hōfu Tenman-gu

Hōfu (防府市, Hōfu-shi) is a city located in Yamaguchi Prefecture, Japan. As of 31 May 2023, the city had an estimated population of 114,846 and a population density of 610 persons per km^{2}. The total area of the city is 92.13 square kilometres (35.57 sq mi).

== Geography ==
Hōfu is located almost in the center of Yamaguchi Prefecture, facing the Seto Inland Sea to the south. The Saba River, a first-class water system, flows from the northwest of the city toward the Seto Inland Sea. On the offshore side, the remains of former salt fields have been reclaimed to form a plain. In the Seto Inland Sea, five islands, Sabajima, Mukaishima, Nojima, Hirashima, and Okishima, belong to the city.

=== Neighbouring municipalities ===
Yamaguchi Prefecture

- Shūnan
- Yamaguchi

=== Climate ===
Hōfu has a humid subtropical climate (Köppen climate classification Cfa) with hot summers and cool winters. Precipitation is significant throughout the year, but is much higher in summer than in winter. The average annual temperature in Hōfu is 15.9 °C (60.6 °F). The average annual rainfall is 1,653.7 mm (65.11 in) with July as the wettest month. The temperatures are highest on average in August, at around 27.5 °C (81.5 °F), and lowest in January, at around 5.0 °C (41.0 °F). The highest temperature ever recorded in Hōfu was 38.1 °C (100.6 °F) on July 25, 2026; the coldest temperature ever recorded was −8.1 °C (17.4 °F) on January 22, 2004.

Climate data for Hōfu (1991−2020 normals, extremes 1977−present)
Month	Jan	Feb	Mar	Apr	May	Jun	Jul	Aug	Sep	Oct	Nov	Dec	Year
Record high °C (°F)	18.8 (65.8)	21.4 (70.5)	26.1 (79.0)	28.7 (83.7)	31.8 (89.2)	32.9 (91.2)	38.1 (100.6)	37.7 (99.9)	36.9 (98.4)	32.0 (89.6)	26.5 (79.7)	23.9 (75.0)	38.1 (100.6)
Mean daily maximum °C (°F)	9.7 (49.5)	10.7 (51.3)	14.2 (57.6)	19.4 (66.9)	24.0 (75.2)	26.7 (80.1)	30.4 (86.7)	31.8 (89.2)	28.5 (83.3)	23.5 (74.3)	17.7 (63.9)	12.1 (53.8)	20.7 (69.3)
Daily mean °C (°F)	5.0 (41.0)	5.9 (42.6)	9.1 (48.4)	14.0 (57.2)	18.8 (65.8)	22.4 (72.3)	26.3 (79.3)	27.5 (81.5)	23.9 (75.0)	18.2 (64.8)	12.5 (54.5)	7.2 (45.0)	15.9 (60.6)
Mean daily minimum °C (°F)	0.7 (33.3)	1.3 (34.3)	4.0 (39.2)	8.7 (47.7)	13.7 (56.7)	18.8 (65.8)	23.1 (73.6)	24.0 (75.2)	20.0 (68.0)	13.5 (56.3)	7.6 (45.7)	2.7 (36.9)	11.5 (52.7)
Record low °C (°F)	−8.1 (17.4)	−7.2 (19.0)	−5.0 (23.0)	−0.4 (31.3)	3.6 (38.5)	9.6 (49.3)	16.2 (61.2)	17.1 (62.8)	8.5 (47.3)	1.8 (35.2)	−0.9 (30.4)	−6.0 (21.2)	−8.1 (17.4)
Average precipitation mm (inches)	55.6 (2.19)	68.9 (2.71)	119.3 (4.70)	142.8 (5.62)	184.1 (7.25)	241.8 (9.52)	315.7 (12.43)	147.7 (5.81)	159.6 (6.28)	88.4 (3.48)	75.1 (2.96)	54.9 (2.16)	1,653.7 (65.11)
Average precipitation days (≥ 1.0 mm)	8.4	8.7	10.2	9.7	8.9	11.7	10.8	8.0	9.0	6.0	7.6	8.6	107.6
Mean monthly sunshine hours	139.4	143.5	174.5	190.8	209.5	148.6	173.9	212.7	172.1	182.2	154.6	143.6	2,045.4
Source: Japan Meteorological Agency

=== Demographics ===
Per Japanese census data, the population of Hōfu in 2020 is 113,979 people. Hōfu has been conducting censuses since 1920.

Historical population
Year	Pop.	±%
1920	61,807	—
1925	64,395	+4.2%
1930	65,721	+2.1%
1935	72,616	+10.5%
1940	76,389	+5.2%
1945	89,843	+17.6%
1950	93,939	+4.6%
1955	96,821	+3.1%
1960	94,513	−2.4%
1965	94,342	−0.2%
1970	97,009	+2.8%
1975	105,540	+8.8%
1980	111,468	+5.6%
1985	118,067	+5.9%
1990	117,634	−0.4%
1995	118,803	+1.0%
2000	117,724	−0.9%
2005	116,818	−0.8%
2010	116,641	−0.2%
2015	115,942	−0.6%
2020	113,979	−1.7%
Hōfu population statistics

== History ==
The area of Hōfu was part of an ancient Suō Province, and the name "Hōfu" (防府) means "the capital (国府) of Suō Province (周防国)". The area has been settled since the Jōmon period. During the Nara period, the Suō Kokubun-ji was located in Hōfu. In the Edo Period, it was part of the holdings of Chōshū Domain. Following the Meiji Restoration, the area was divided into villages within Saba District, Yamaguchi, including the villages of Saba and Mitajiri with the creation of the modern municipalities system on April 1, 1889. The two villages merged to form the town of Hōfu on January 1, 1902. Hōfu was elevated to city status on August 25, 1936. The city's change over the past fifty years is shown in the animated film Mai Mai Miracle, with its story taking place in the year of 1955 (with flashbacks going 1,000 years further back).

== Government ==
Hōfu has a mayor-council form of government with a directly elected mayor and a unicameral city council of 25 members. Hōfu contributes four members to the Yamaguchi Prefectural Assembly. In terms of national politics, the city is part of the Yamaguchi 1st district of the lower house of the Diet of Japan.

== Economy ==
Hōfu was a port settlement and noted for its salt production in ancient times. In the early modern period, the area rapidly industrialized, with textile mills and large scale factories established on the site of the former salt farms and coastal areas. There are a large concentration of transportation-related industries in the area. In addition to the large Mazda automobile factory companies such as Bridgestone, Kyowa Hakko Bio, and Tokai Carbon are in the city. The city is also home to an Japan Air Self-Defense Force training base.

== Education ==
Hōfu has 17 public elementary school and ten public junior high schools operated by the city government, and three public high schools operated by the Yamaguchi Prefectural Board of Education. There are also one private junior high school and two private high schools. The private Yamaguchi Junior College is located in the city.

== Transportation ==
=== Railway ===
JR West (JR West) - San'yō Main Line

- Tonomi - Hōfu Freight Terminal - Hōfu - Daidō

=== Highways ===
- San'yō Expressway
- National Route 2
- National Route 262

== Sister cities ==
- Akitakata, Hiroshima, Japan since July 16, 1971
- Chuncheon, Gangwon-do, South Korea since October 29, 1991
- Monroe, Michigan, United States, since May 29, 1993

== Local attractions ==
- Hōfu Tenman-gū
- Mōri Museum
- Suō Kokubun-ji, National Historic Site
- Tamanooya Shrine, ichinomiya of Suō Province

== Sports ==
- Hofu Keirin venue

== Notable people ==
- Gin Maeda, actor
- Kamiyama Mitsunoshin, 11th Governor-General of Taiwan
- Taneda Santōka, poet
- Hiroki Yasumoto, voice actor
