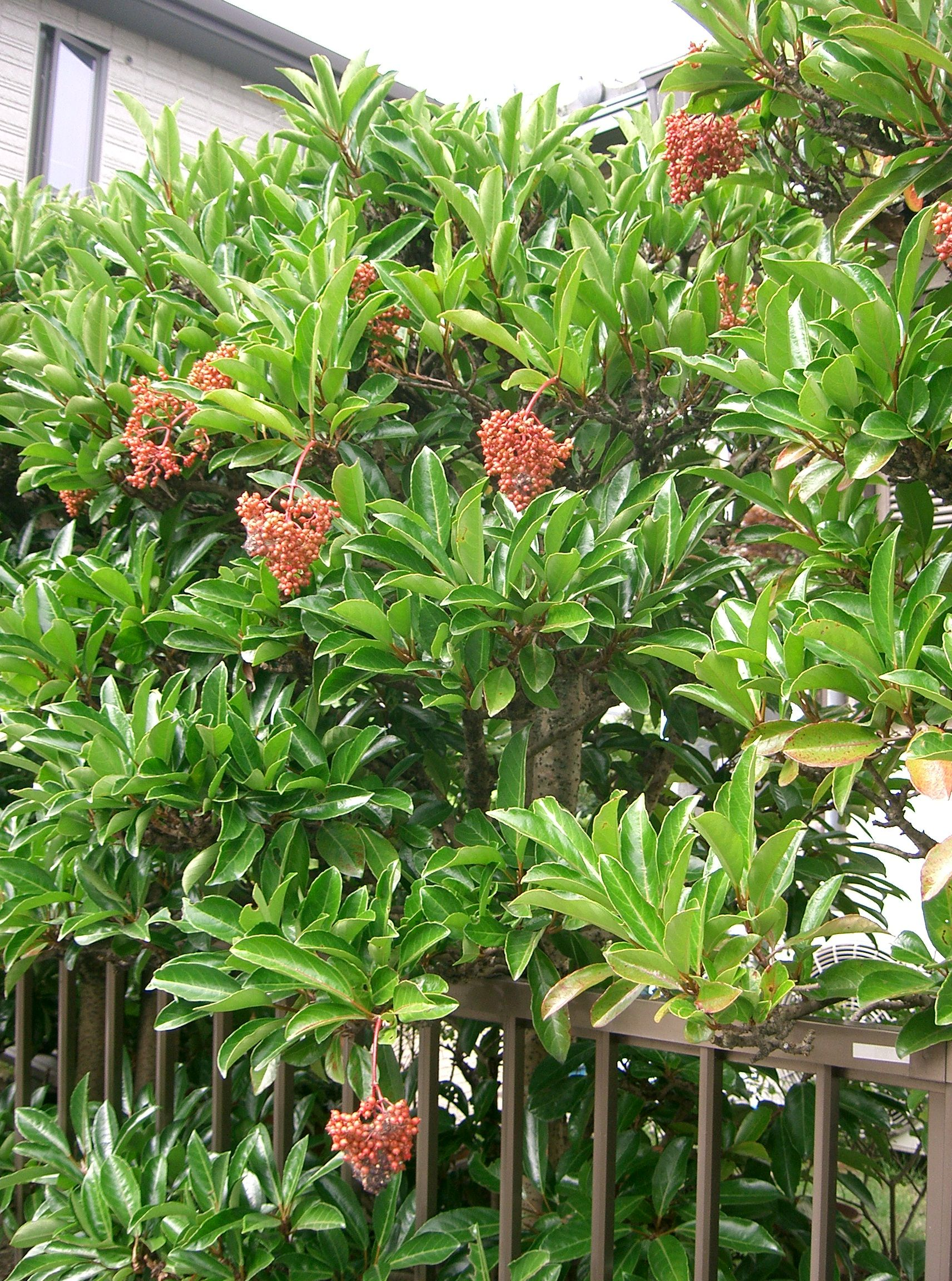
- In a garden
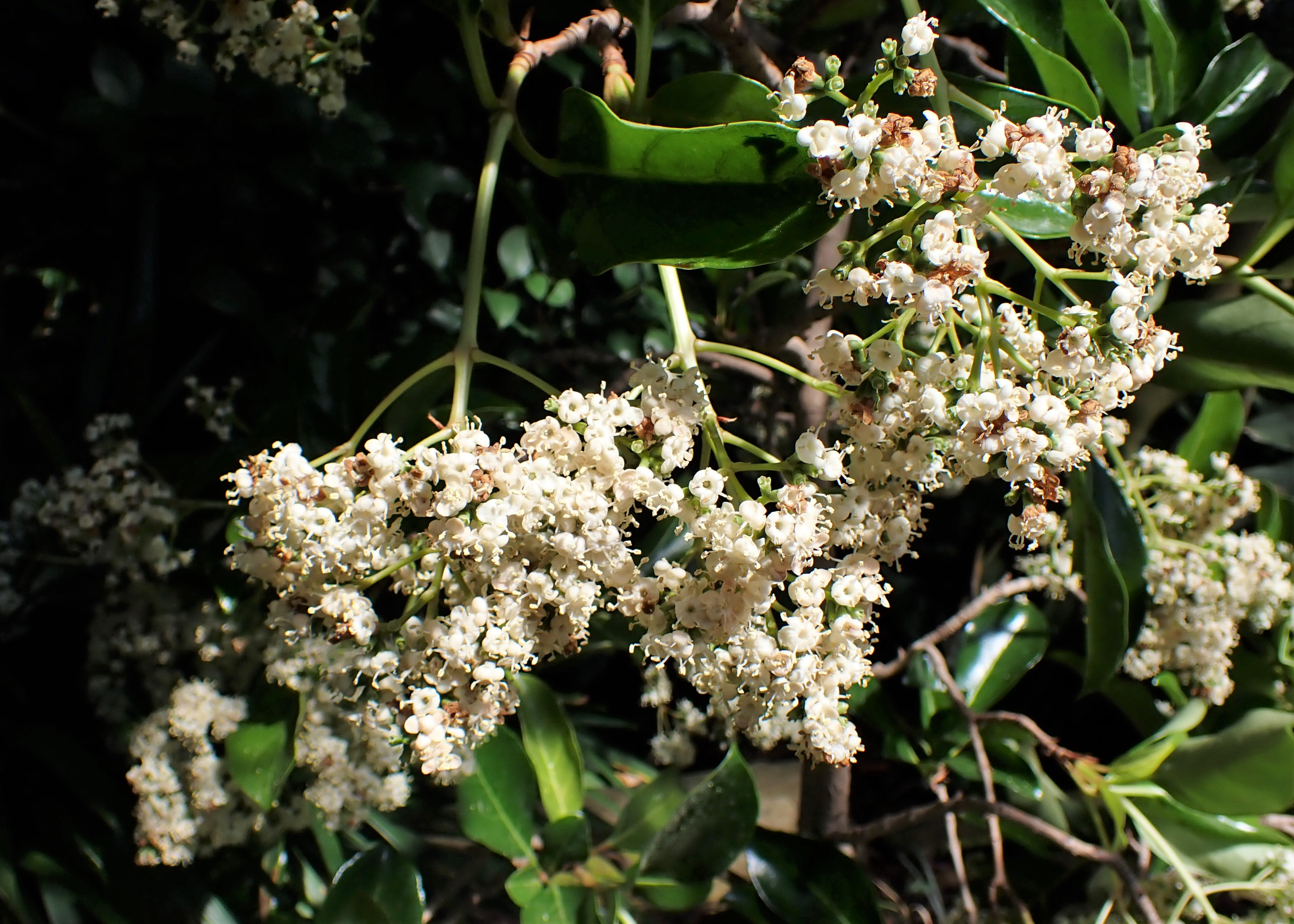
- Flowers

Scientific classification
- Kingdom: Plantae
- Clade: Tracheophytes
- Clade: Angiosperms
- Clade: Eudicots
- Clade: Asterids
- Order: Dipsacales
- Family: Viburnaceae
- Genus: Viburnum
- Species: V. awabuki

Binomial name
- Viburnum awabuki K.Koch

Synonyms
- Viburnum liukiuense Nakai; Viburnum odoratissimum var. awabuki (K.Koch) Zabel ex Rümpler; Viburnum odoratissimum var. conspersum W.W.Sm.; Viburnum odoratissimum var. serratum Makino

= Viburnum awabuki =

Species of plant

Viburnum awabuki, the Awabuki sweet viburnum, is a species of flowering plant in the family Viburnaceae. Many authorities consider it to be a variety of Viburnum odoratissimum, Viburnum odoratissimum var. awabuki. It is native to eastern Asia; Korea, Japan, the Ryukyus, and Taiwan, and is a common ornamental in China. An evergreen shrub or tree usually 5 m (16 ft) tall, with some individuals reaching 8 m (26 ft), it is typically found in coastal forests at elevations from sea level to 1,500 m (4,900 ft). Hardy in USDA Zones 7 through 9, the unimproved ("wild type") species and a number of cultivars are available from commercial suppliers.

== Distinguishing features ==
Viburnum awabuki and Viburnum odoratissimum are similar and are often confused. The most apparent difference is that V. awabuki has thick, coriaceous (leathery) and glossy leaves, while V. odoratissimum has thin, papery, dull leaves. Additionally, the petioles of V. awabuki are reddish, while V. odoratissimum petioles are green, and the corollas of V. awabuki are campanulate (bell-shaped), while V. odoratissimum corollas are subrotate (wheel-shaped).

== Etymology ==
Viburnum awabuki goes by two names in Japanese: sangoju (サンゴジュ), meaning "coral tree" and referring to the color of the fruit, and awabuki (アワブキ) meaning "bubble blowing". During a fire, Viburnum awabuki plants resist burning by "blowing bubbles"—exuding foam—from their thick leaves and from their woody parts. For this reason Viburnum awabuki is planted as hedges to protect buildings from fires. Viburnum awabuki was described by Karl Koch in 1867.

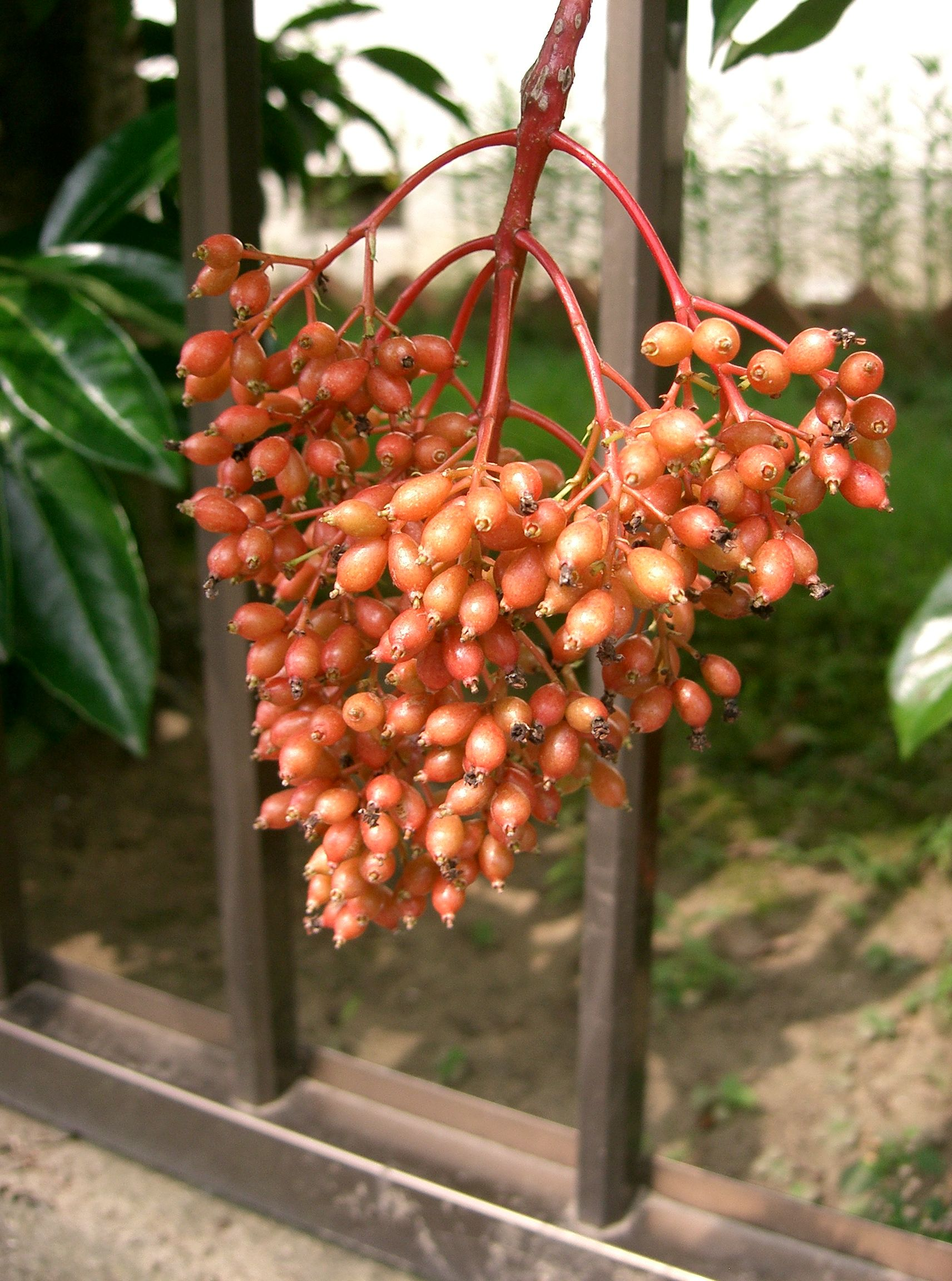
Fruit cluster

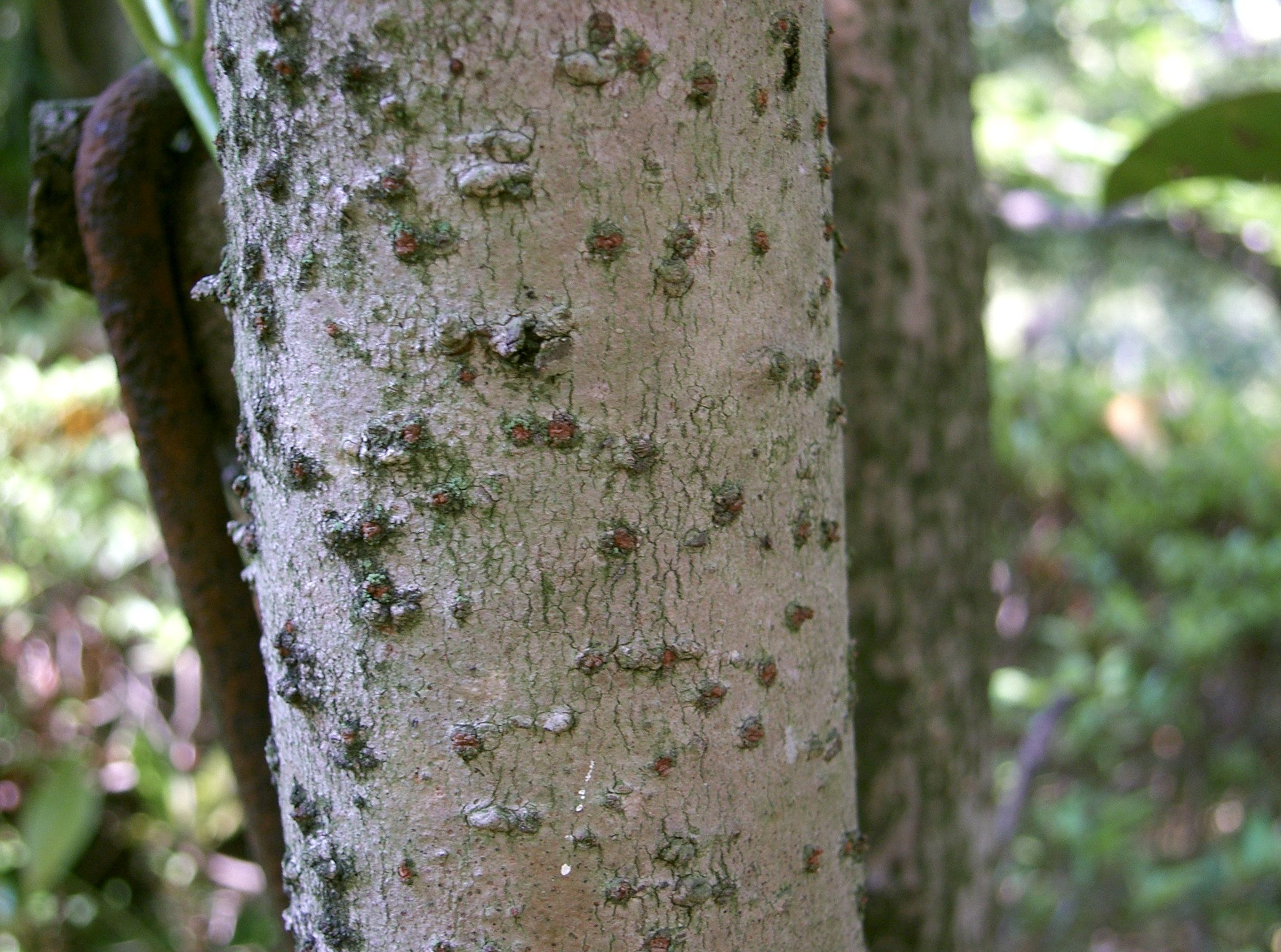
Bark

== Cultivars ==
Viburnum awabuki 'Chindo', the Mirror Leaf Viburnum, was collected on Jindo island, South Korea, by J.C. Raulston and brought to the North Carolina State University Arboretum (now the JC Raulston Arboretum). More compact than the wild type, 'Chindo' handles pruning well and is recommended for screens and hedges.

The even more compact Viburnum awabuki 'Emerald Lustre' reaches 4 m (13 ft) and is available from commercial nurseries.

== Uses ==
It is extensively used as an ornamental in China and Japan, in a variety of landscaping applications; park tree, street tree, hedging, and in green roofs, firebreaks, windbreaks, and storm-surge resistance plantings. In the past it was used as a fish poison by artisanal fishers. The phytochemicals produced by the plant, including vibsanins, salicin, emulsin, diterpenoids, triterpenes, and sesquiterpenes, have been extensively isolated and cataloged, with an eye towards their potential anticarcinogenic and anti-tumor properties.
