= Hōfu Station =

Railway station in Hōfu, Yamaguchi Prefecture, Japan

Hōfu Station 防府駅
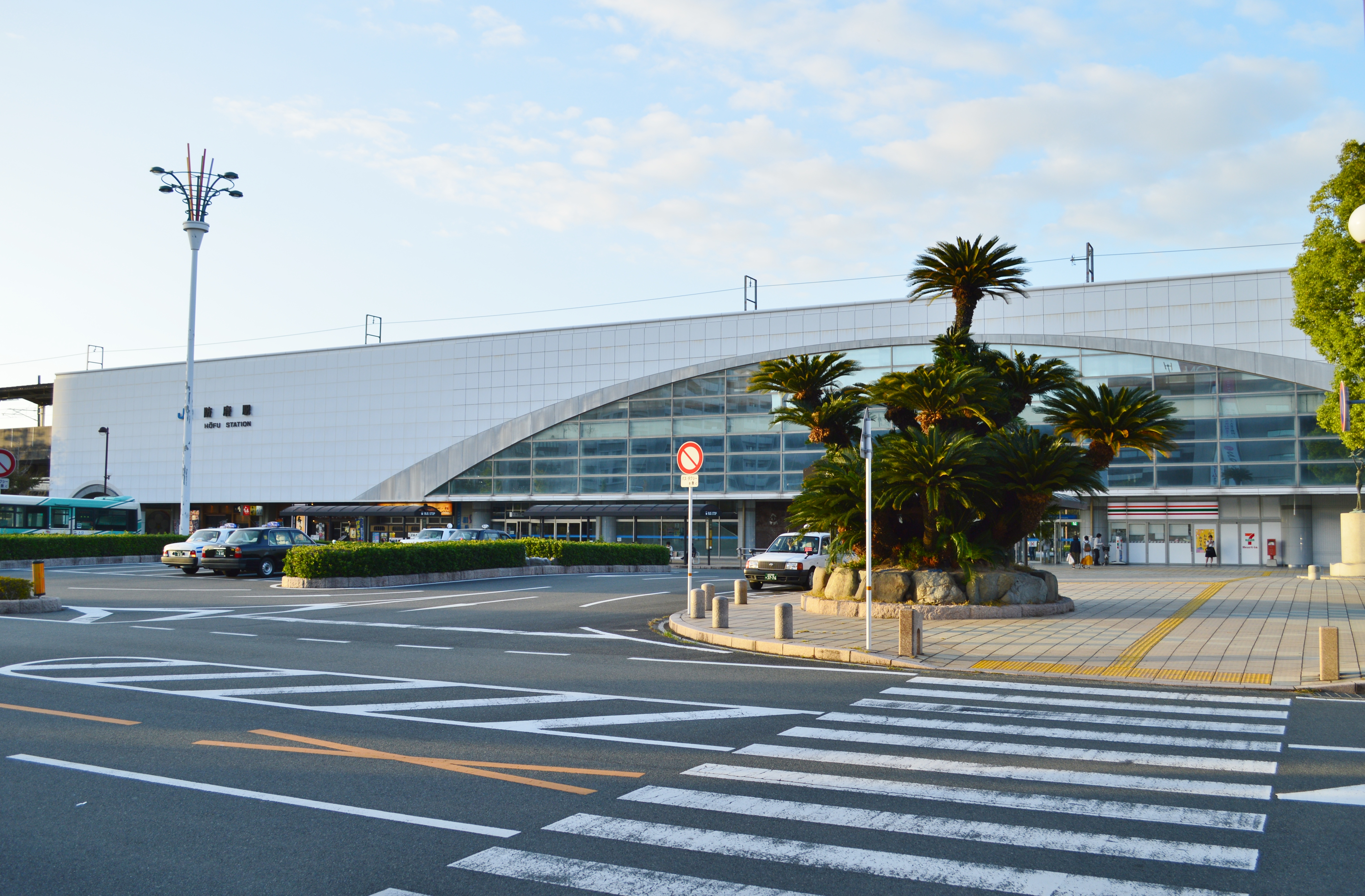
- Hōfu Station in October 2019

General information
- Location: 1-chōme-1 Ebisumachi, Hōfu-shi, Yamaguchi-ken 747-0036; Japan
- Coordinates: 34°3′12.37″N 131°34′8.29″E
- Owner: West Japan Railway Company
- Operator: West Japan Railway Company
- Line: San'yō Line
- Distance: 441.4 km (274.3 miles) from Kobe
- Platforms: 1 island platforms
- Tracks: 2
- Connections: Bus stop

Construction
- Structure type: Elevated
- Accessible: Yes

Other information
- Status: Staffed
- Website: Official website

History
- Opened: 17 March 1897; 129 years ago
- Former names: Mitajiri Station (to 1962)

Passengers
- FY2022: 3560

Services
| Preceding station | JR West | Following station |
|---|---|---|
| Daidō towards Shimonoseki | San'yō Line Local | Tonomi towards Iwakuni |
| Shin-Yamaguchi One-way operation | San'yō Line West Express Ginga | Tokuyama towards Osaka |
Location
- Location within Yamaguchi Prefecture Location within Japan

Hōfu Station (防府駅, Hōfu-eki) is a passenger railway station located in the city of Hōfu, Yamaguchi Prefecture, Japan. It is operated by the West Japan Railway Company (JR West).

== Lines ==
Hōfu Station is served by the JR West Sanyō Main Line, and is located 441.4 kilometers from the terminus of the line at Kobe.

== Station layout ==
The station consists of one island platform with an elevated station building. The station is staffed.

== Platforms ==
| 1 | ■ San'yō Line | for Tokuyama and Hiroshima |
| 2 | ■ San'yō Line | for Shin-Yamaguchi and Shimonoseki |

== History ==
Hōfu Station was opened on 17 March 1897 as Mitajiri Station (三田尻駅) on the San'yo Railway when the line was extended from Tokuyama. On 25 May 1899, Japan's first express train with a dining car started operating between Mitajiri and Kyoto Station. On 8 April 1900, Japan's first sleeper train began operating between Kobe Station and Mitajiri. The San'yo Railway was railway nationalized in 1906 and the line renamed the San'yo Main Line in 1909. The station was renamed Hōfu Station on 1 November 1962. With the privatization of the Japan National Railway (JNR) on 1 April 1987, the station came under the aegis of the West Japan railway Company (JR West).

== Passenger statistics ==
In fiscal 2022, the station was used by an average of 3560 passengers daily.

== Surrounding area ==
- Hōfu Tenmangū
- Suō Kokubun-ji
- Yamaguchi Prefectural Hōfu General Government Building
- Hōfu City Hall

== See also ==
- List of railway stations in Japan
