= Ōuchihikami Kofun =

Kofun period burial mound in Yamaguchi, Japan

- 大内氷上古墳 (Japanese)
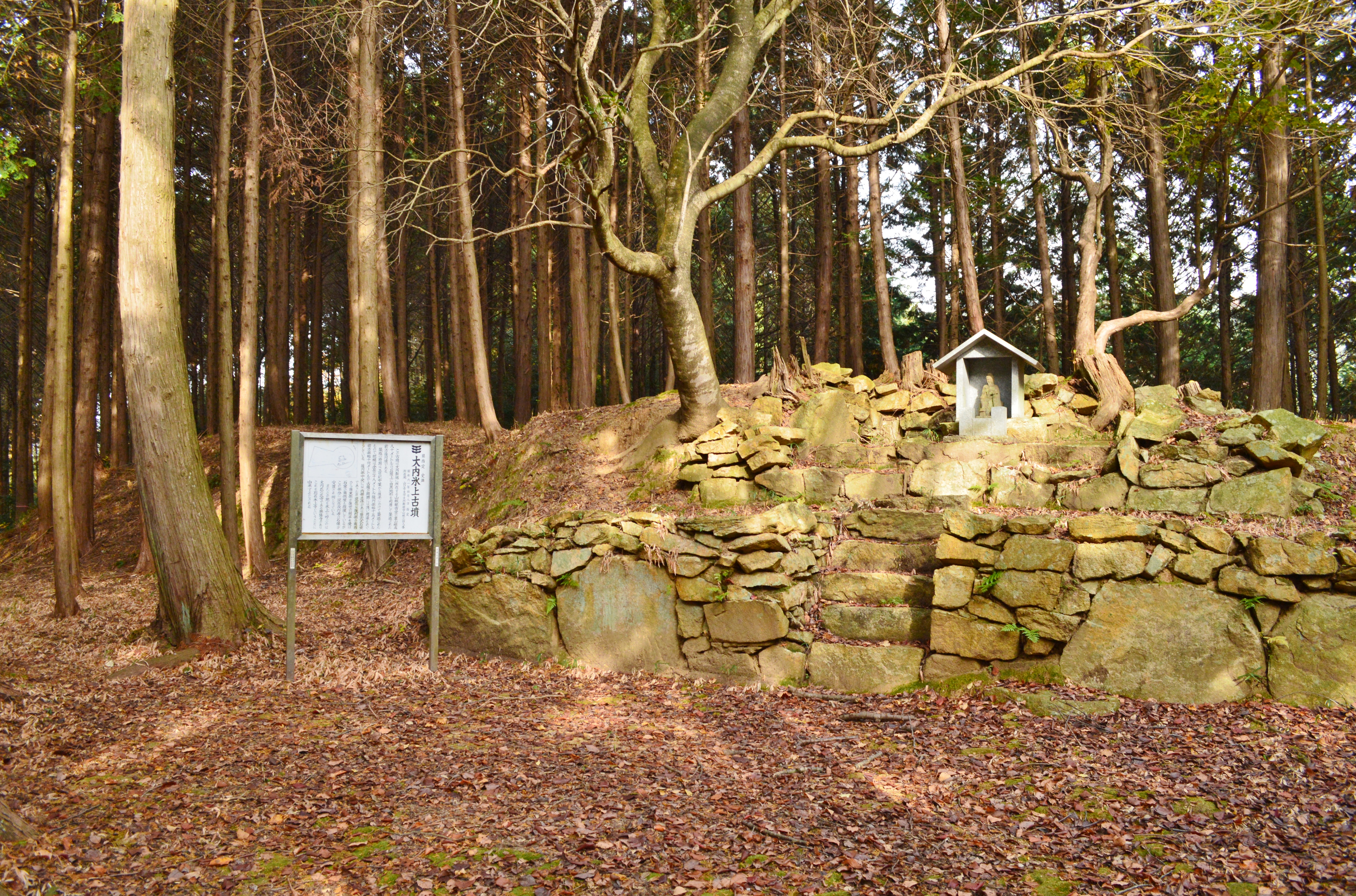
- Ōuchihikami Kofun (rear circular section on the right, front rectangular section in the back left)

- Ōuchihikami Kofun Ōuchihikami Kofun (Japan)
- Interactive map of Ōuchihikami Kofun
- 34°09′55.15″N 131°29′45.15″E
- Type: Kofun
- Periods: Kofun period
- Location: Ōuchimihori, Yamaguchi, Yamaguchi Prefecture, Japan
- Region: Chugoku region

History
- Built: mid- to late 5th century

Site notes
- Public access: yes
- Yamaguchi Prefecture Historic Site

The Ōuchihikami Kofun (大内氷上古墳) is a Kofun period burial mound, located in the Ōuchimihori neighborhood of the city of Yamaguchi, Yamaguchi Prefecture in the Chugoku region of western Japan. The tumulus was designated a Yamaguchi Prefecture Historic Site in 1986.

== Overview ==
The Ōuchihikami Kofun is a zenpō-kōen-fun (前方後円墳), which is shaped like a keyhole, having one square end and one circular end, when viewed from above. It is located on a hill on the northern edge of the Ōuchi Basin in central Yamaguchi Prefecture (and is the only existing keyhole-shaped tumulus in the Yamaguchi City area). The southern side of the circular posterior section of the mound has been leveled, and an archaeological excavation was conducted in 1985.

The mound is orientated with the rectangular anterior section facing northwest. A shallow moat surrounds the mound. The burial facility is a vertical shaft stone burial chamber, and the structure shows characteristics of the box-shaped stone coffins found in the Yamaguchi region. The main axis of the burial chamber is slightly west of the main axis of the burial mound, and measures 2.86 meters in length, 0.6 meters in width (estimated), and 0.7 meters in depth (estimated). However,the south side of the stone chamber is damaged, and a shrine to En no Gyōja has been erected there. One iron arrowhead was unearthed from the burial chamber as the only surviving grave goods.

The construction period is estimated to be the mid-to-late 5th century, during the middle of the Kofun period.

Total length
28 meters:
Anterior rectangular portion
14 meters wide x 2.3 meters high
Posterior circular portion
15 meters diameter x 2.8 meters high

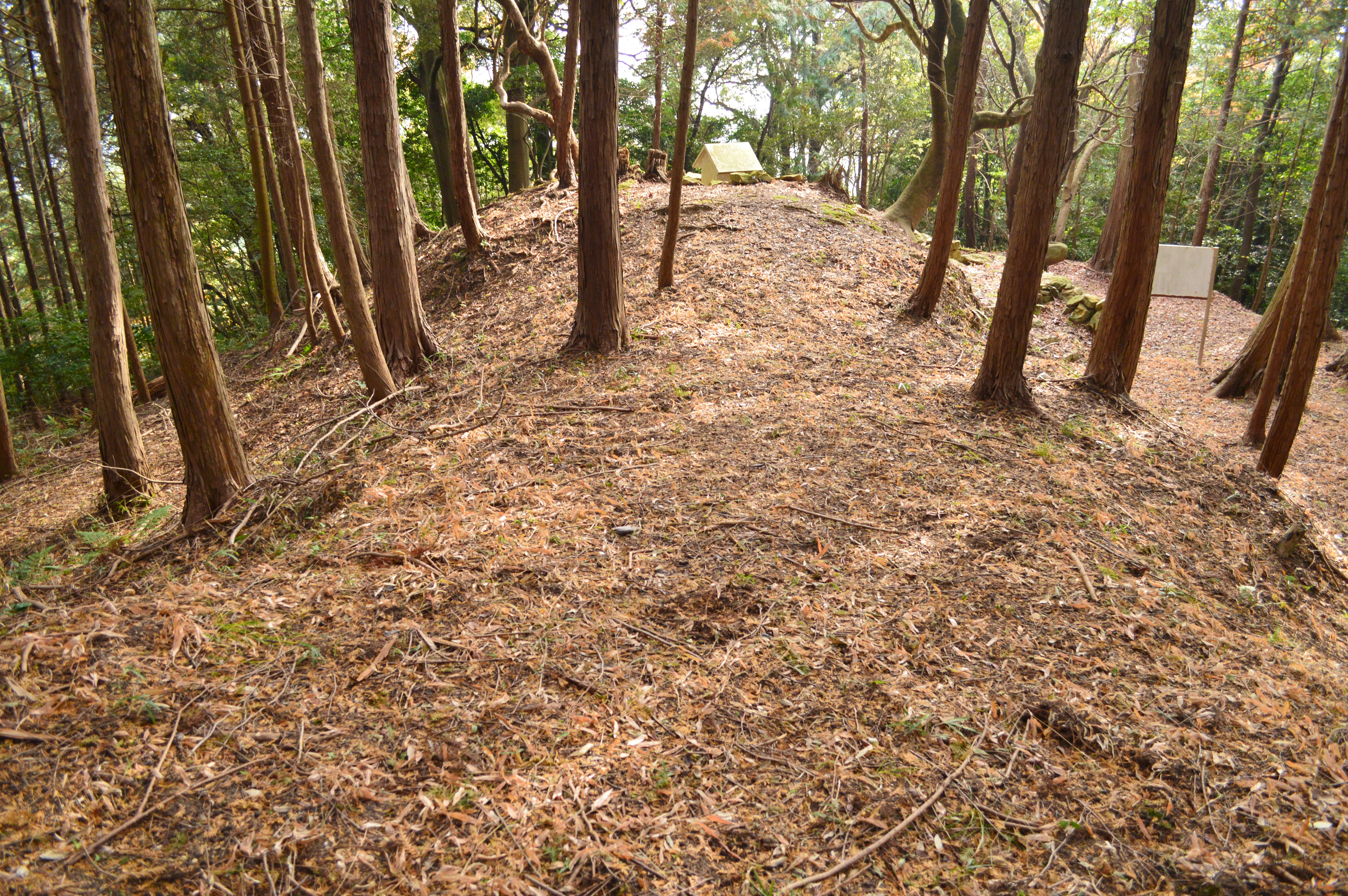
View of the rear circular section from the front section

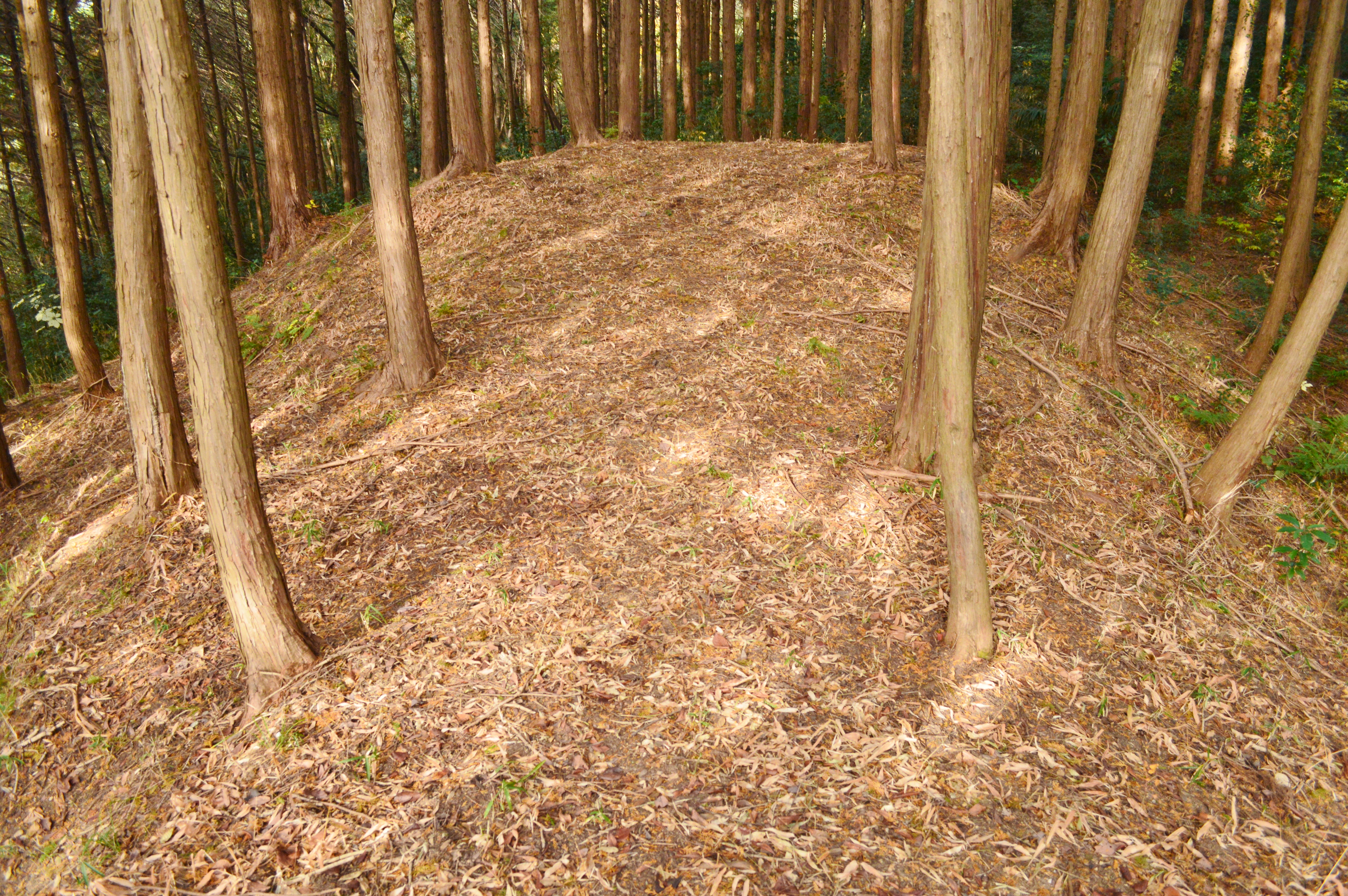
View of the front section from the rear circular section

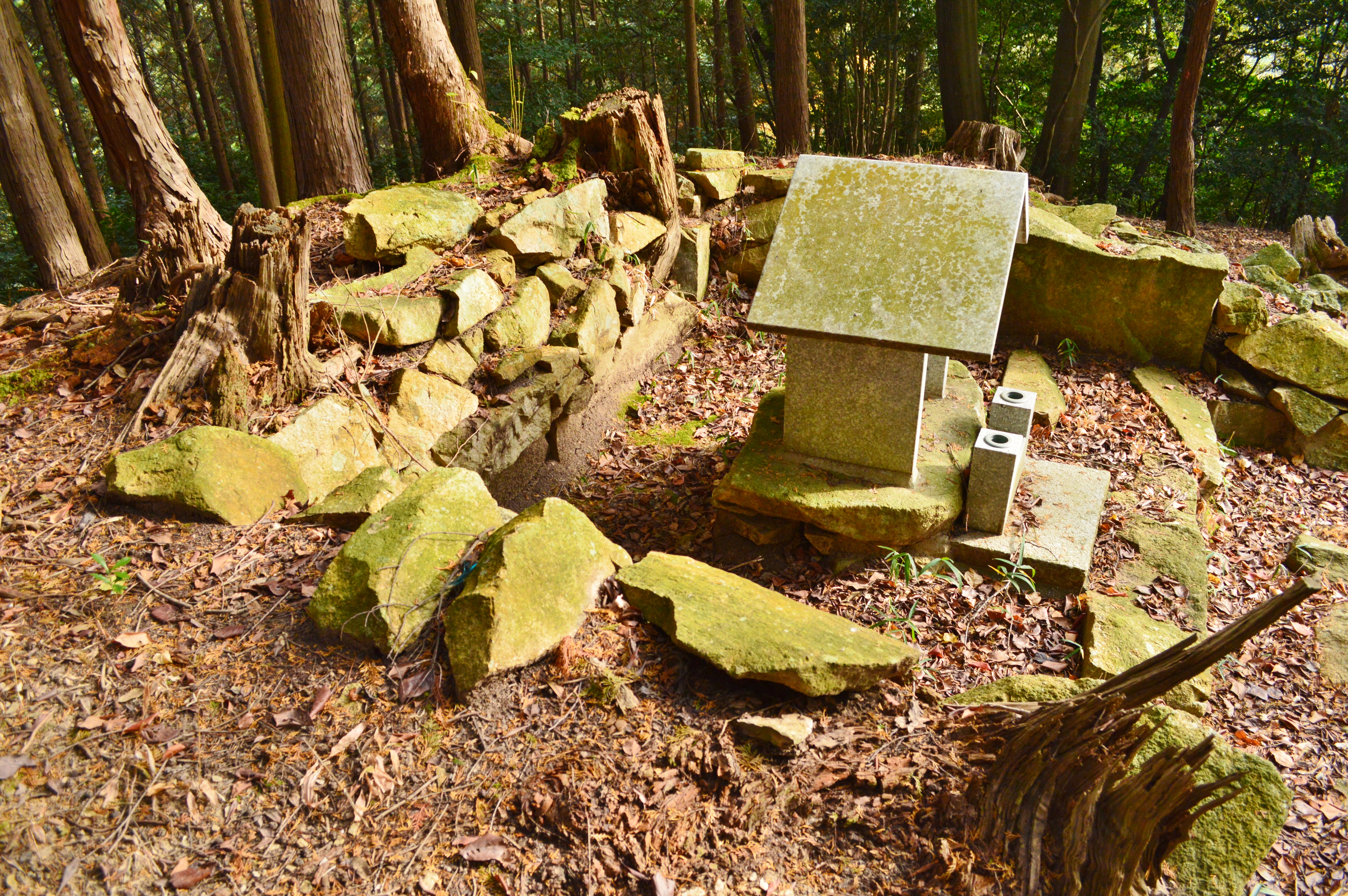
Burial chamber at the top of the rear circular section

The tumulus is approximately 2.6 kilometers southeast of Yamaguchi Station on the JR West Yamaguchi Line.

== See also ==
- List of Historic Sites of Japan (Yamaguchi)
