= Nagato Mint =

- 長門鋳銭所 (Japanese)
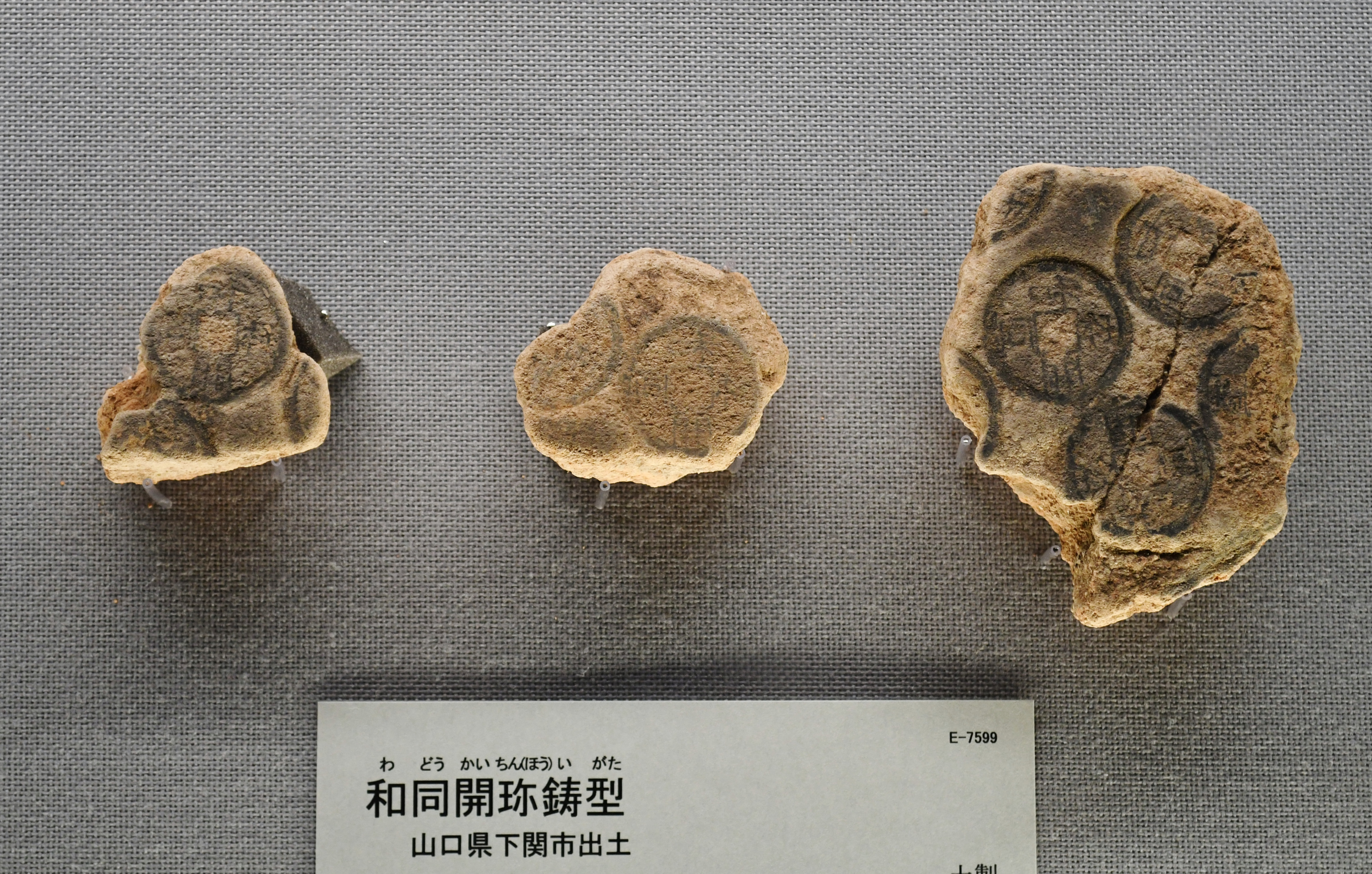
- Wadōkaichin molds from the Nagato Mint

- Nagato Mint ruins Nagato Mint (Japan)
- Interactive map of Nagato Mint
- 34°00′01″N 130°58′57″E
- Type: Industrial site
- Periods: Nara period
- Location: Shimonoseki, Yamaguchi, Japan
- Region: San'yō region

History
- Built: c.8th century

Site notes
- Public access: Yes (no facilities)

The Nagato Mint (長門鋳銭所, Nagato no jusenji) was a mint for the production of bronze coins located in the Chofu Anyoji neighborhood of the city of Shimonoseki, Yamaguchi Prefecture in the San'yō region of Japan. The site was designated a National Historic Site of Japan in 1929.

== History ==
The use of copper coinage was introduced to Japan from the Tang dynasty during the Asuka period, and the first Japanese copper coin was the Wadōkaichin (和同開珎) which were produced from 708. This coinage was inspired by the Tang dynasty coinage (唐銭) named Kaigen Tsūhō (Chinese: 開元通宝, Kāiyuán tōngbǎo), first minted in Chang'an in 621 CE. The wadōkaichin had the same specifications as the Chinese coin, with a diameter of 2.4 cm and a weight of 3.75 g.

The site of the Nagato Mint is now located in the partly within precincts of a Buddhist temple, Kakuon-ji. During construction work, one piece of Wadōkaichin, and its mold, bellows mouth, and a crucible were unearthed from 60 to 90 centimeters underground. It is believed that the Nagato Mint started minting coins at the latest around 730 621 CE in the Nara period. In addition to Nagato Province, it was known from documents that the Wadōkaichin was also cast in six locations: Musashi, Ōmi, Kawachi, Harima Provinces and Dazaifu; however, it is only at the Nagato site that any physical evidence has been confirmed as a ruin. The Nagato Mint was abolished around 825 and moved to the Suō Mint (also a National Historic Site). The excavated items are collectively designated as an Important Cultural Property.

== See also ==
- List of Historic Sites of Japan (Yamaguchi)
