= Kunimori Kofun =

Kofun period burial mound in Tabuse, Yamaguchi, Japan

- 国森古墳 (Japanese)
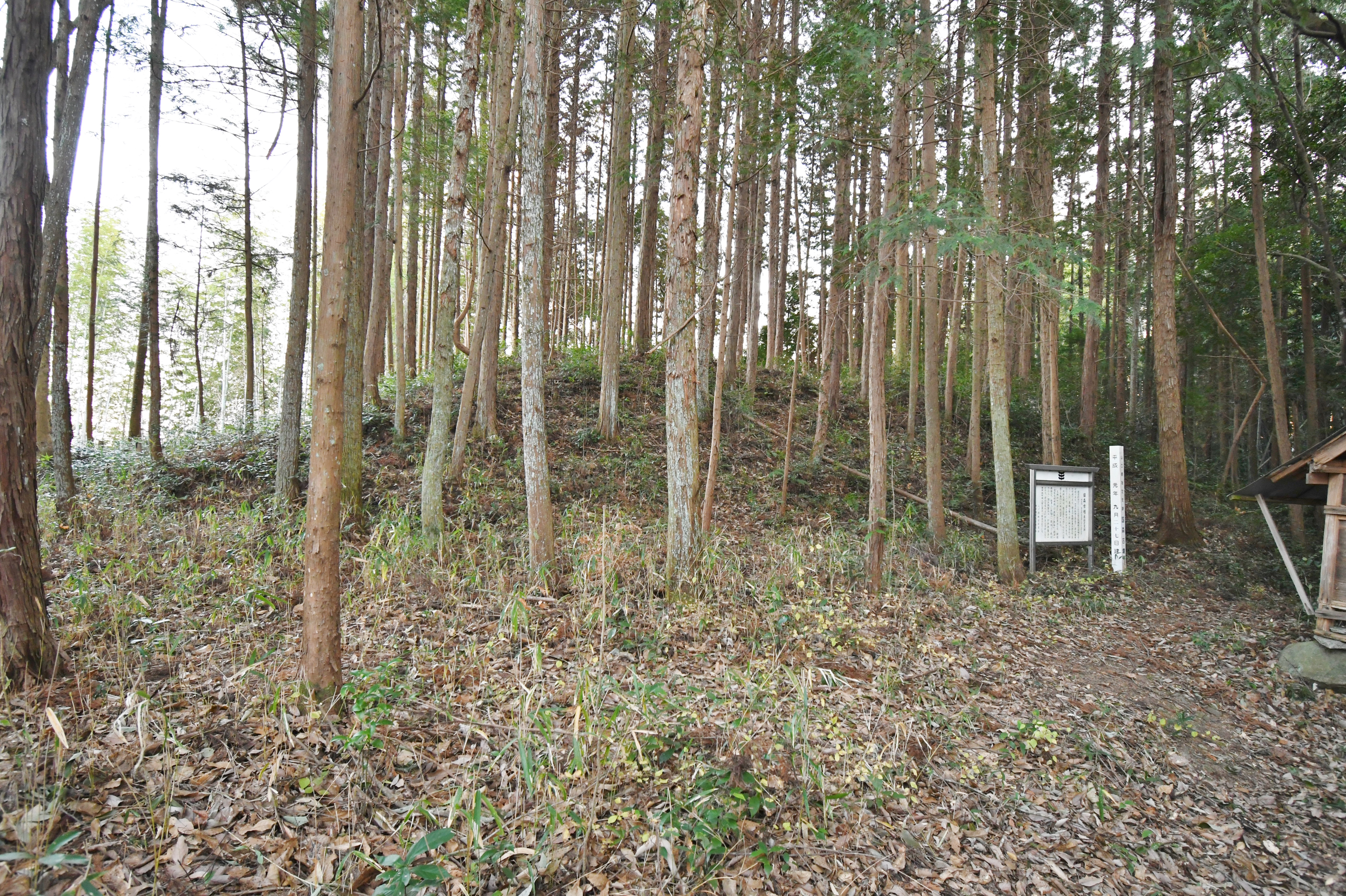
- Kunimori Kofun

- Kunimori Kofun Kunimori Kofun (Japan)
- Interactive map of Kunimori Kofun
- 33°57′32″N 132°1′21.75″E
- Type: Kofun
- Periods: Kofun period
- Location: Kawanishi, Tabuse-cho, Yamaguchi-ken
- Region: Chugoku region

History
- Built: early 4th century

Site notes
- Public access: Yes
- Yamaguchi Prefecture Historic Site

The Kunimori Kofun (国森古墳) is a Kofun period burial mound, located in the Kawanishi neighborhood of the town of Tabuse, Yamaguchi Prefecture in the Chugoku region of Japan. It was designated a Yamaguchi Prefecture Historic Site in 1988. The artifacts recovered from this tumulus are collectively designated as a Yamaguchi Prefectural Tangible Cultural Property.

== Overview ==
The Kunomori Kofun was constructed on the Tabuse Hills in the lower reaches of the Tabuse River in southeastern Yamaguchi Prefecture. An archaeological excavation was conducted in 1987.

The mound is a hofun (方墳) style square tumulus with an overhang on the east side, measuring approximately 27.5 meters north-south, 30 meters east-west, and four meters high. The overhang measures approximately four meters long and one meter high. While fukiishi revetment stones are visible on the outer surface of the mound, no haniwa clay figures have been found. Demarcation ditches are visible on the eastern and western bases of the mound. The burial facility is a direct burial in a wooden coffin, with the coffin's main axis oriented north-south (possibly with the head facing north). The burial pit for the wooden coffin is constructed in two stages slightly east of the top of the burial mound. The first tier of the burial pit is a rectangular shape with rounded corners, measuring 8.6 meters in length, 6.0 meters in width, and approximately 0.1–0.3 meters in depth. The second tier is a rectangular shape with rounded corners, measuring 5.8 meters in length, 2.6 meters in width, and 1.3–1.4 meters in depth. The floor is clay, and vermilion is visible in the area where the wooden coffin is presumed to have been located.

Although the wooden coffin itself no longer exists, excavations have yielded numerous grave goods, including one bronze mirror, iron weapons, and iron tools, both inside and outside the coffin. From the construction method and the artifacts discovered, the construction period is estimated to be around the beginning of the 4th century, during the early Kofun period, making it is one of the oldest tumuli in Yamaguchi Prefecture. While this period saw the construction of standardized keyhole-shaped tumuli (zenpō-kōen-fun) with vertical shaft stone burial chambers and triangular-rimmed bronze mirrors under the influence of the Yamato court in the Kinai region, this tumulus lacks these elements, making it important as a tumulus from before the construction of standardized keyhole-shaped tumuli.

Excavated artifacts are now exhibited at the Tabuse Town Local History Museum. The Kunimori Kofun about 2.5 kilometers west of Tabuse Station on the JR West San'yō Main Line.

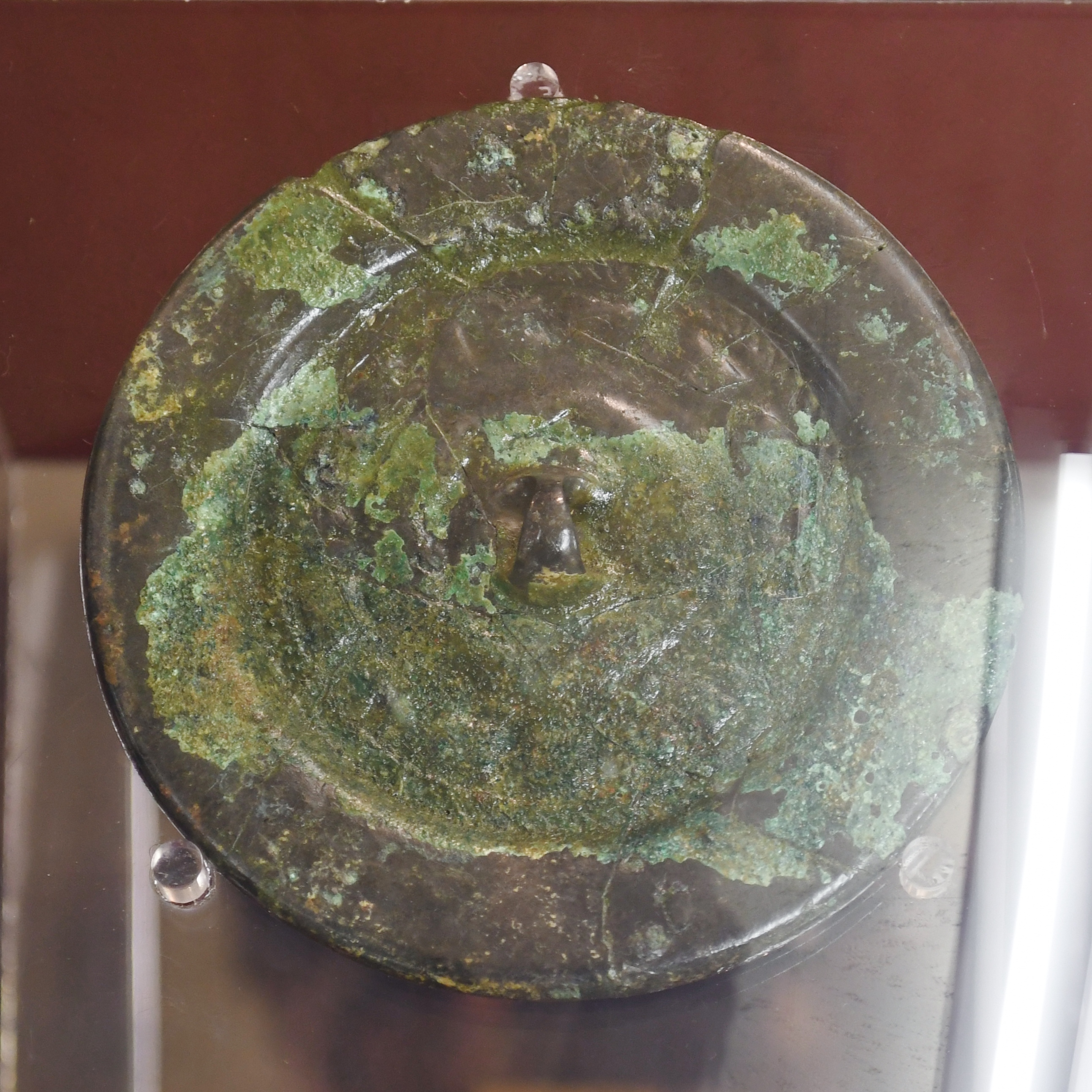
Bronze mirror

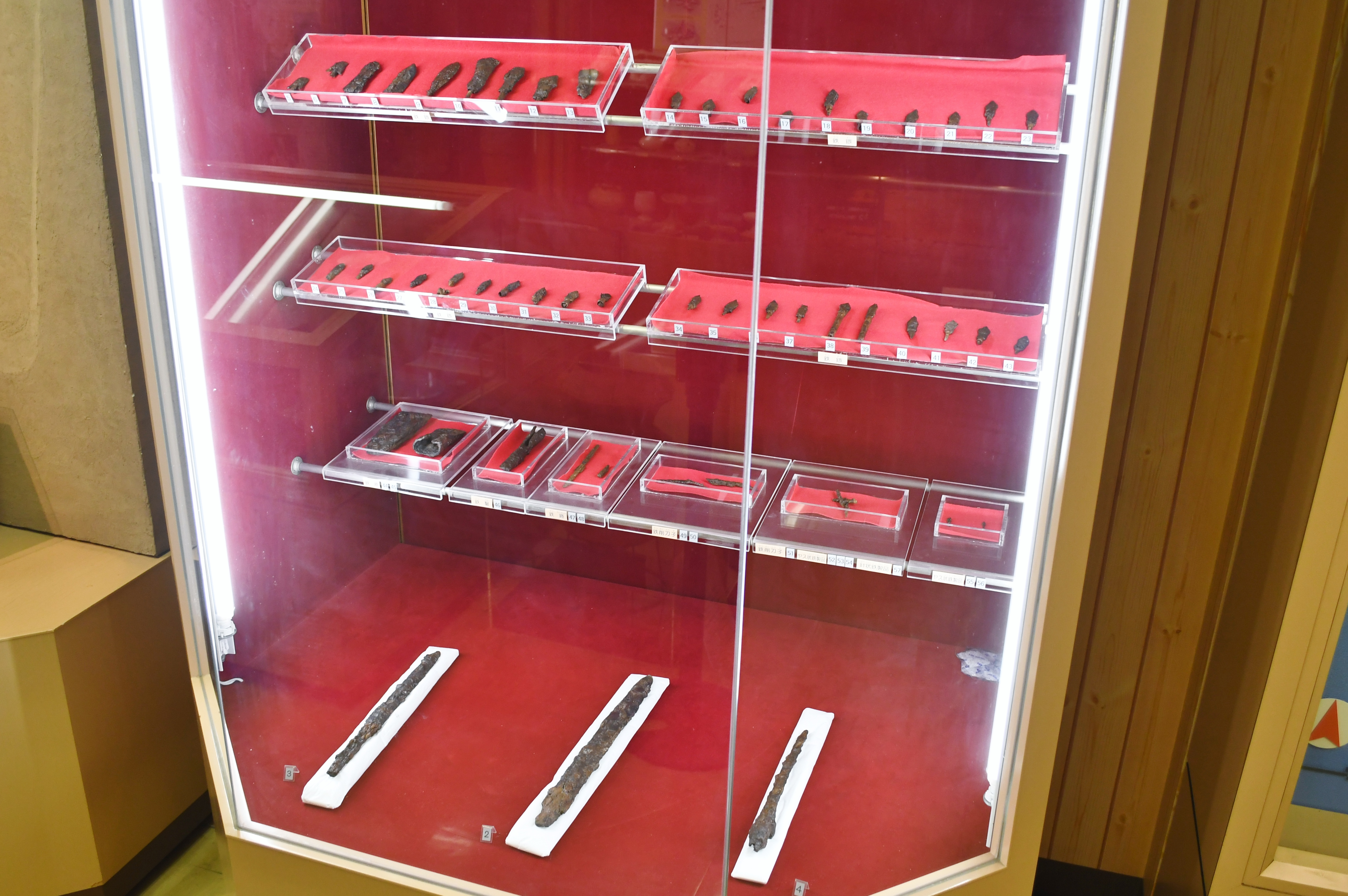
Iron grave goods

== See also ==
- List of Historic Sites of Japan (Yamaguchi)
