= Goi Kofun cluster =

Kofun period burial mound cluster in Tabuse, Yamaguchi, Japan

- 後井古墳群 (Japanese)
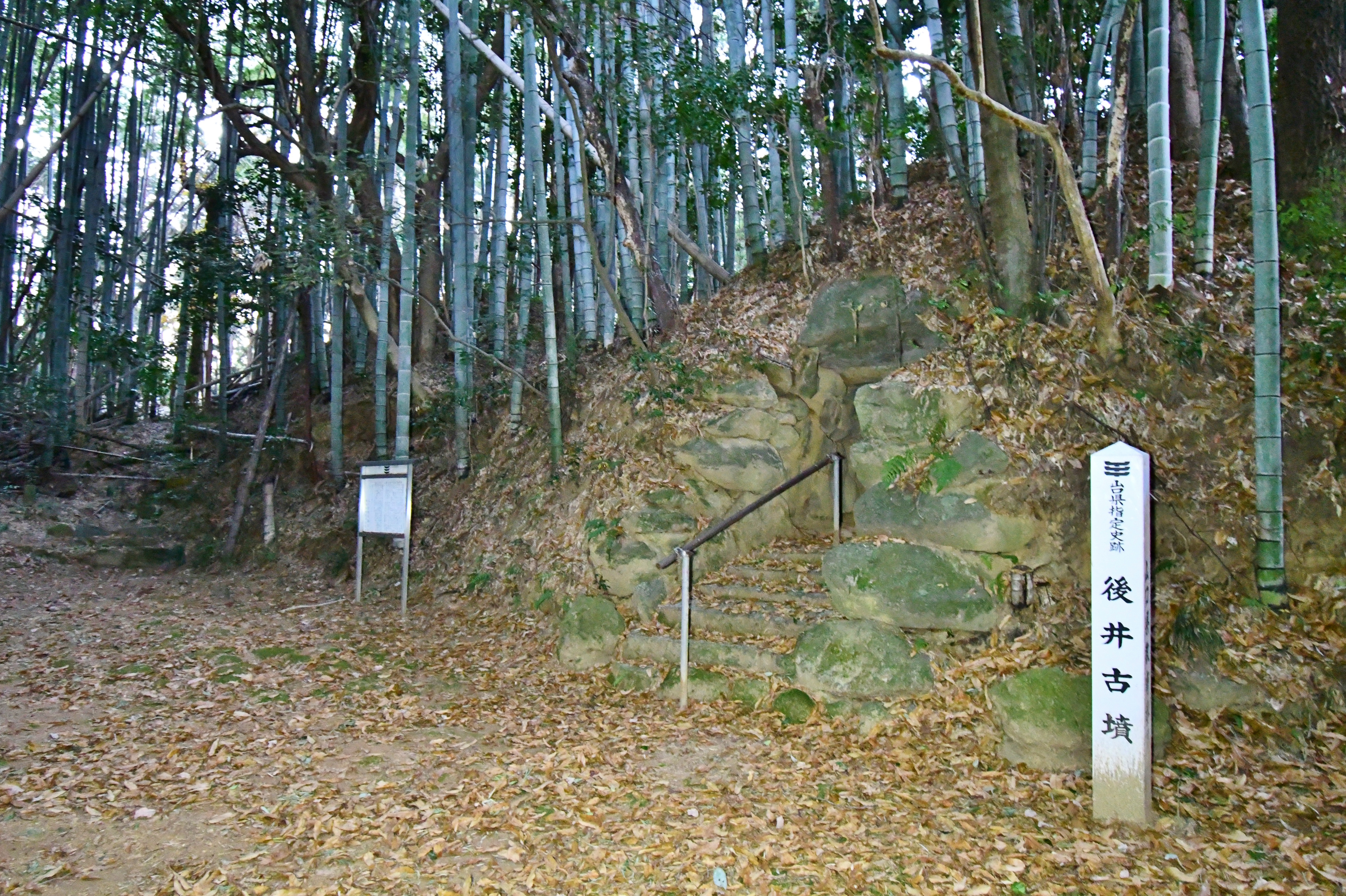
- Goi Kofun cluster, No.1 to right, No.2 to left

- Goi Kofun cluster Goi Kofun cluster (Japan)
- Interactive map of Goi Kofun cluster
- 33°57′42.04″N 132°1′37.61″E
- Type: Kofun cluster
- Periods: Kofun period
- Location: Shukui, Tabuse-cho, Yamaguchi-ken
- Region: Chugoku region

History
- Built: late 6th-early 7th century

Site notes
- Public access: Yes (park)
- Yamaguchi Prefecture Historic Site

The Goi Kofun cluster (後井古墳群) (also known as the Akibayama Kofun cluster (秋葉山古墳群)) is a group of Kofun period burial mound, located in the Shukui neighborhood of the town of Tabuse, Yamaguchi Prefecture in the Chugoku region of Japan. Kofun No.1 and Kofun No.2 of this tumulus cluster were collectively designated a Yamaguchi Prefecture Historic Site in 1978.

== Overview ==
This group of burial mounds was constructed on Terayama (approximately 60 meters above sea level), one of the hills at the southern foot of Ishijoyama in southeastern Yamaguchi Prefecture. As of 1995, 11 burial mounds had been identified, of which archaeological excavations have been conducted on Kofun No. 1, 2, and 3 in 1991, with numerous grave goods found in Kofun No.3. Kofun No.2 was re-excavated in 1989, and was found to be a zenpō-kōen-fun (前方後円墳) keyhole-shaped tumulus only in 1998. Of the burial mounds, Kofun No. 1 and No. 2 are aligned east-west, overlapping the base of the mounds. In particular, Kofun No. 1 features a horizontal-entry stone burial chamber constructed using massive stones, making it the largest burial chamber in Yamaguchi Prefecture. The other tumuli remain unexamined and therefore their details are unknown. Kofun No. 1 and No. 2 are estimated to have been constructed during the late to final period of the Kofun period, around the end of the 6th to the beginning of the 7th century. Kofun No. 1, in particular, is considered important as it is thought to be the tomb of a chieftain connected to the lineage of the Suō Kuni no miyatsuko family.

=== Kofun No. 1 ===
Kofun No. 1 is located at the highest point of the hill and is the main tumulus of the Goi Tumulus Group. It is an enpun (前墳) style circular tumulus, measuring approximately 15 meters in diameter and 4.5 meters in height. The burial facility is a single-chambered horizontal-entry stone burial chamber opening to the south-southeast. The burial chamber has a total length of approximately 11.9 meters, with the chamber proper measuring six by 3.5 meters and the entry passage six by 1.8 meters, with a height of 1.8 meters. Megaliths were used in the construction, making it the largest of its kind in Yamaguchi Prefecture. Grave goods unearthed from the burial chamber include two silver earrings, two jasper magatama beads, and 19 iron arrowheads. The construction period is estimated to be the late to final period of the Kofun period, around the end of the 6th to early 7th century. Currently, a Shinto shrine dedicated to Akiba Myōjin is enshrined within the burial chamber.

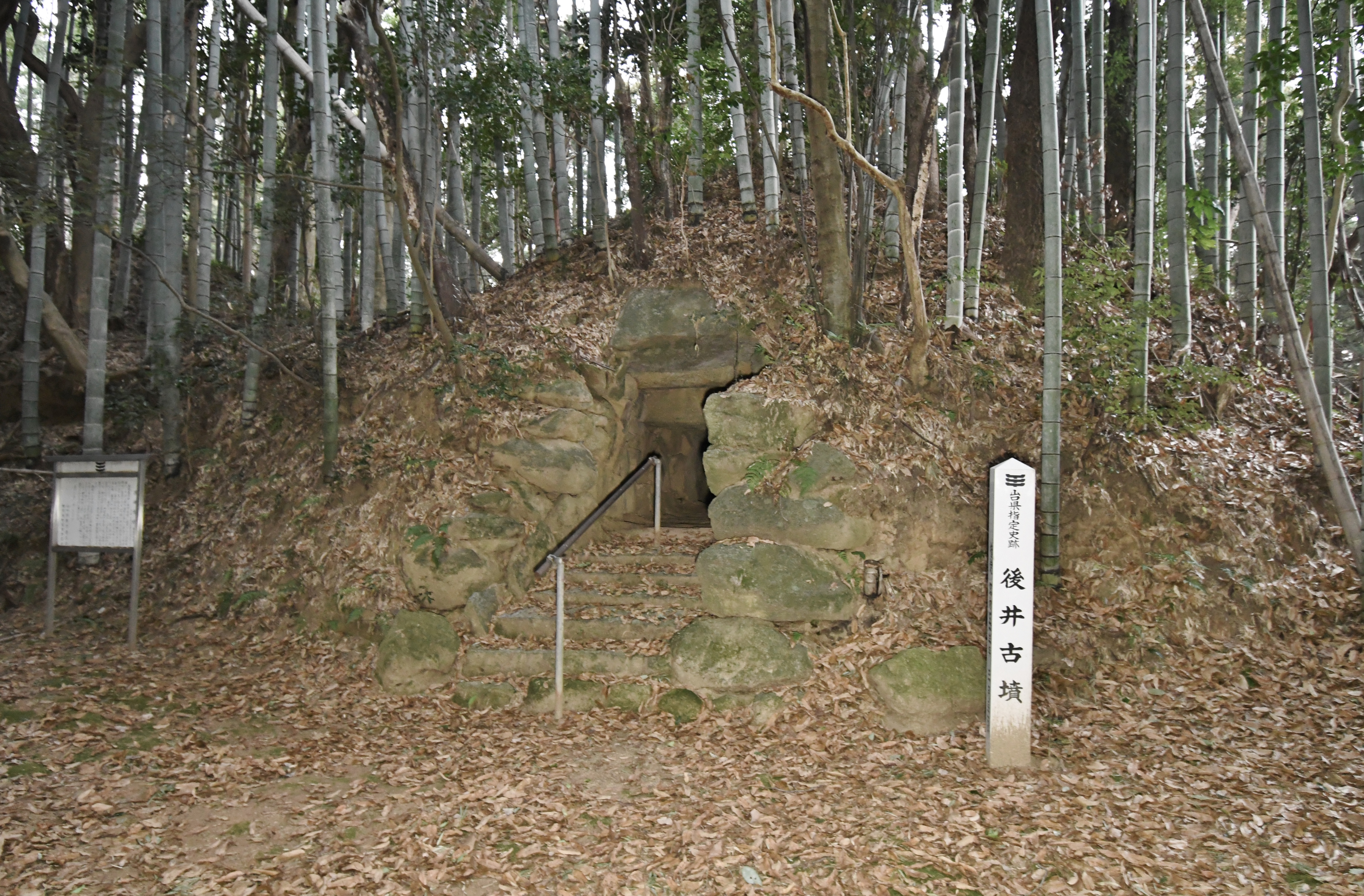
Goi Kofun No.1

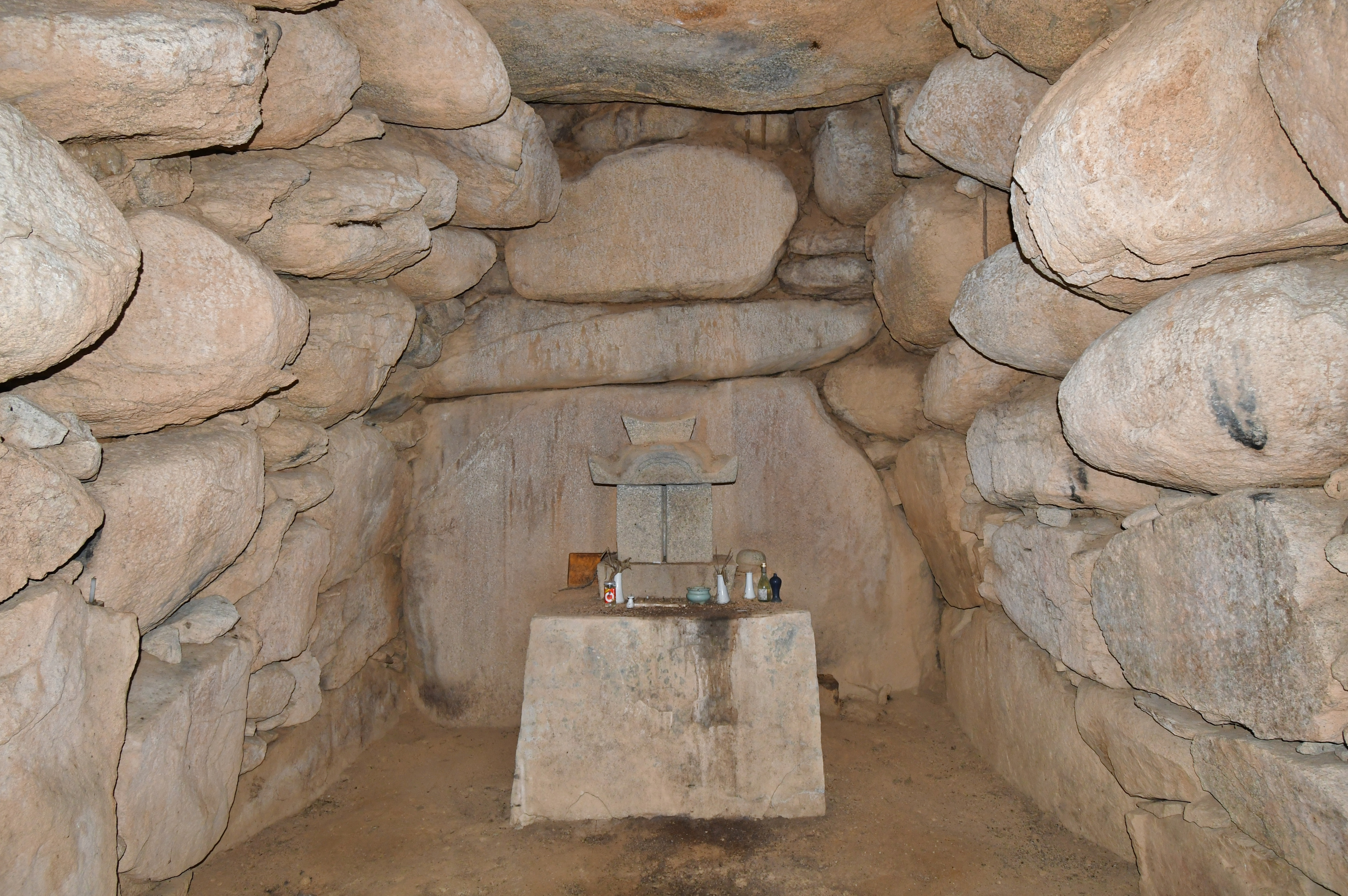
Burial Chamber (Towards the Back Wall)

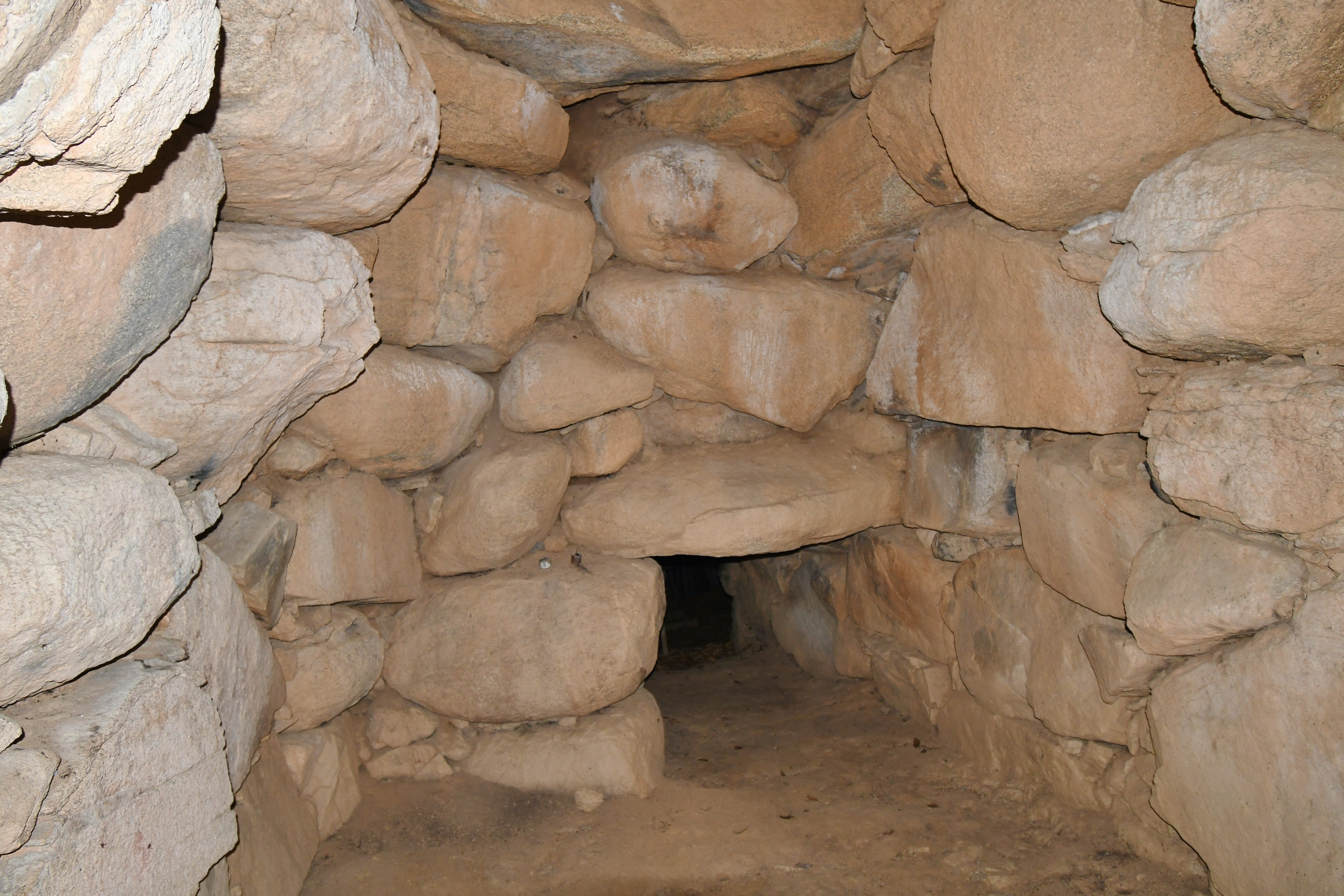
Burial Chamber (Towards the Openingl)

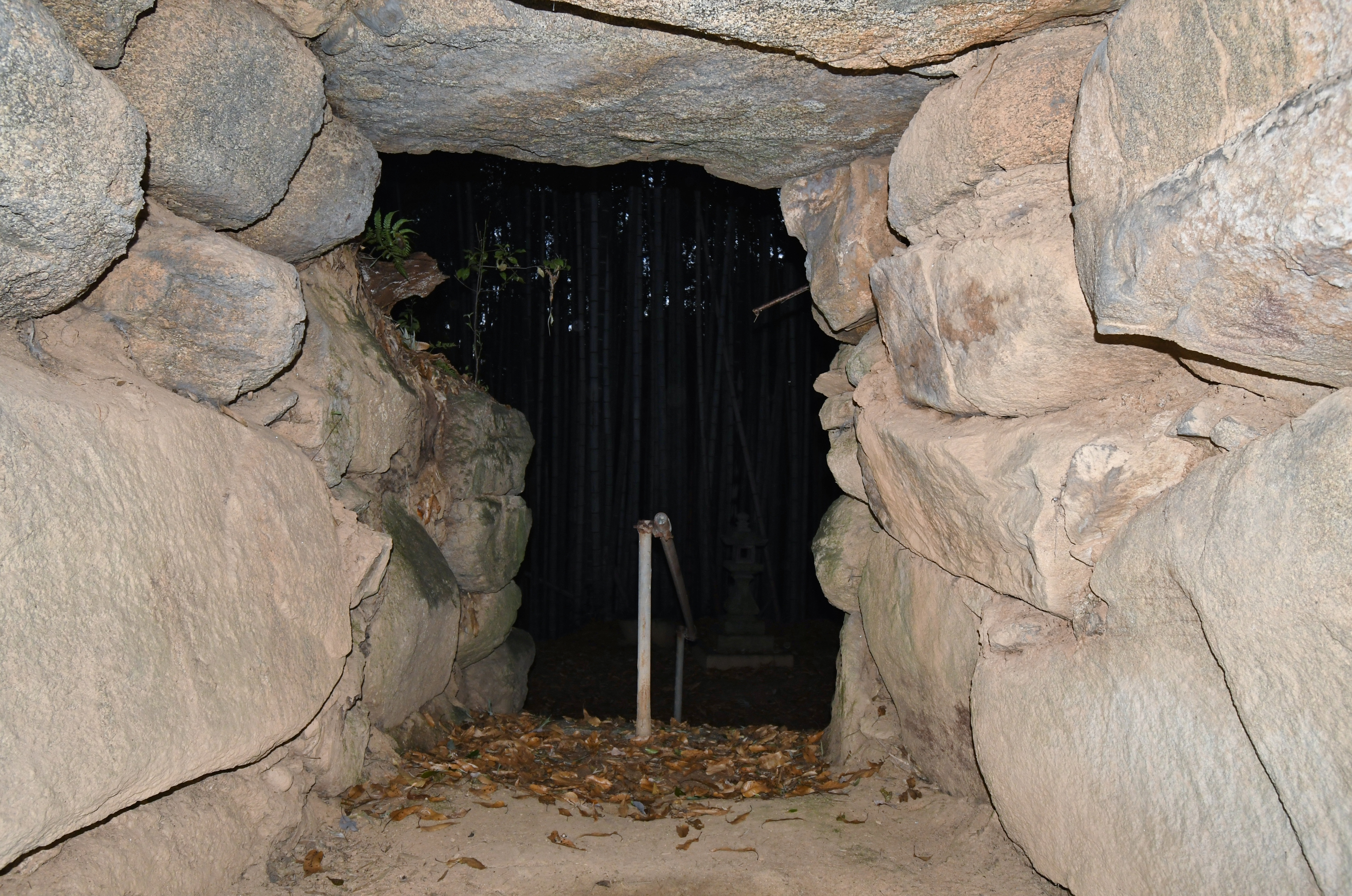
Entrance Passage (Towards the Opening)

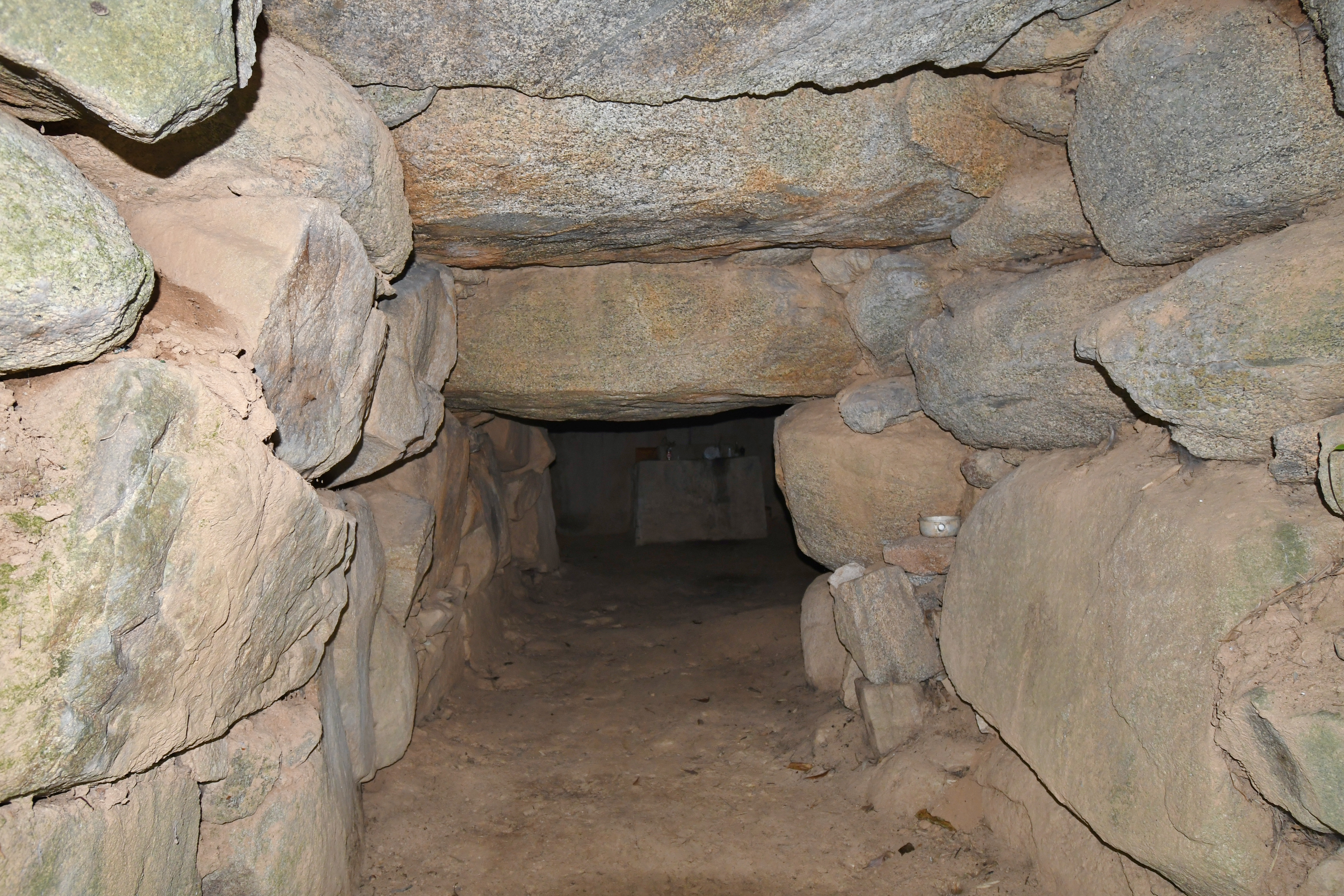
Entrance Passage (Towards the Burial Chamber)

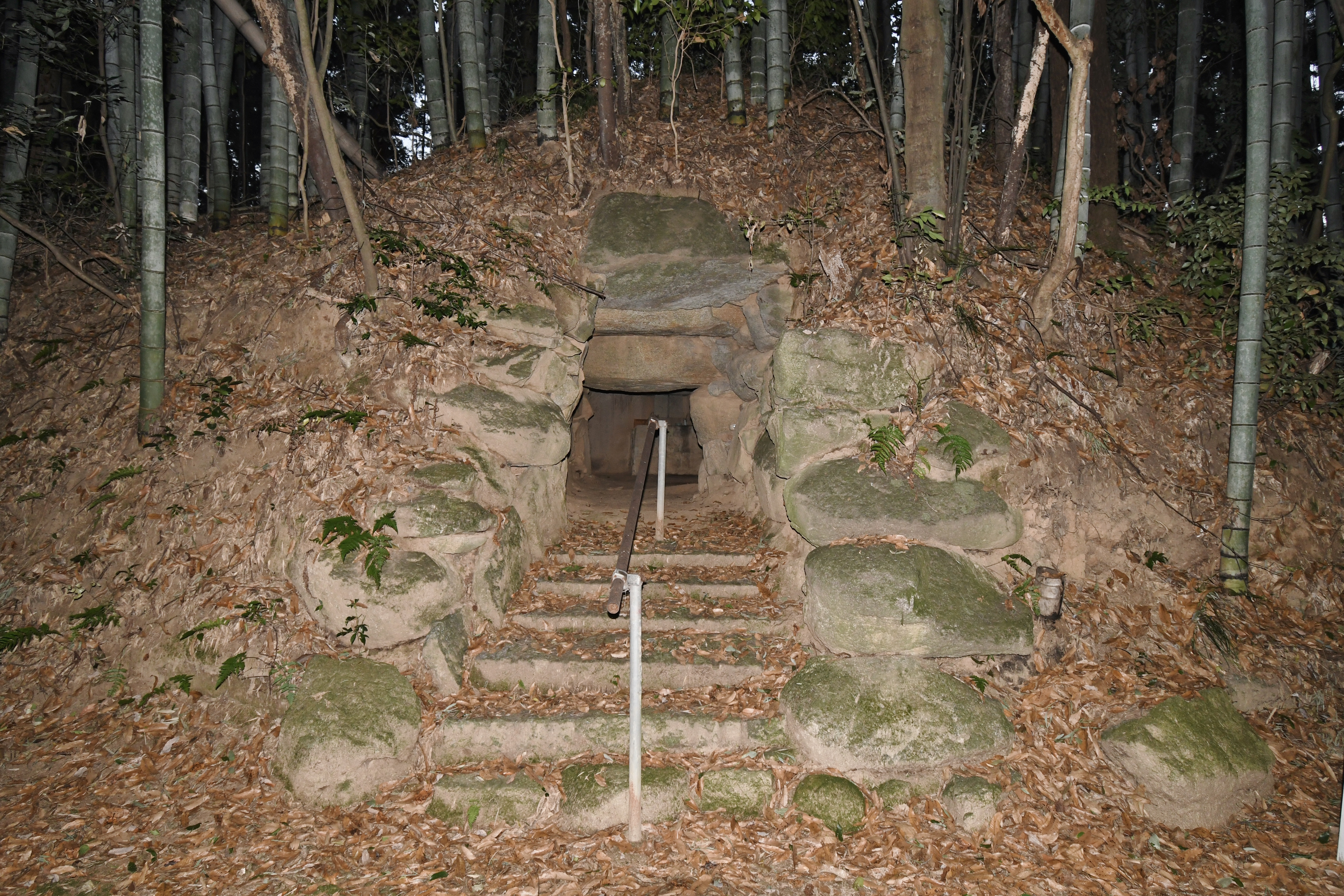
Entrance

=== Kofun No. 2 ===
Kofun No. 2 is a tumulus located west of Kofun No.1. Its shape is a keyhole-shaped tumulus. Its base is adjacent to Kofun No. 1. The posterior circular portion approximately 32 meters in diameter and four meters high, but the anterior rectangular portion has been destroyed. The burial facility is a double-chambered horizontal-entry stone burial chamber, opening to the south-southeast. The burial chamber has a total length of 7.3 meters, with the chamber proper measuring 3.2 by 2.5 meters with a height of 3.1 meters. The burial chamber is characterized by its construction method and a standing stone at the entrance. Grave goods unearthed from this chamber include 6 iron arrowheads, 1 iron knife, and Sue ware pottery (6 bowls, 5 pedestaled bowls, and 1 jar). The construction period is estimated to be the late to final period of the Kofun era, around the end of the 6th to early 7th century, similar to Kofun No. 1.

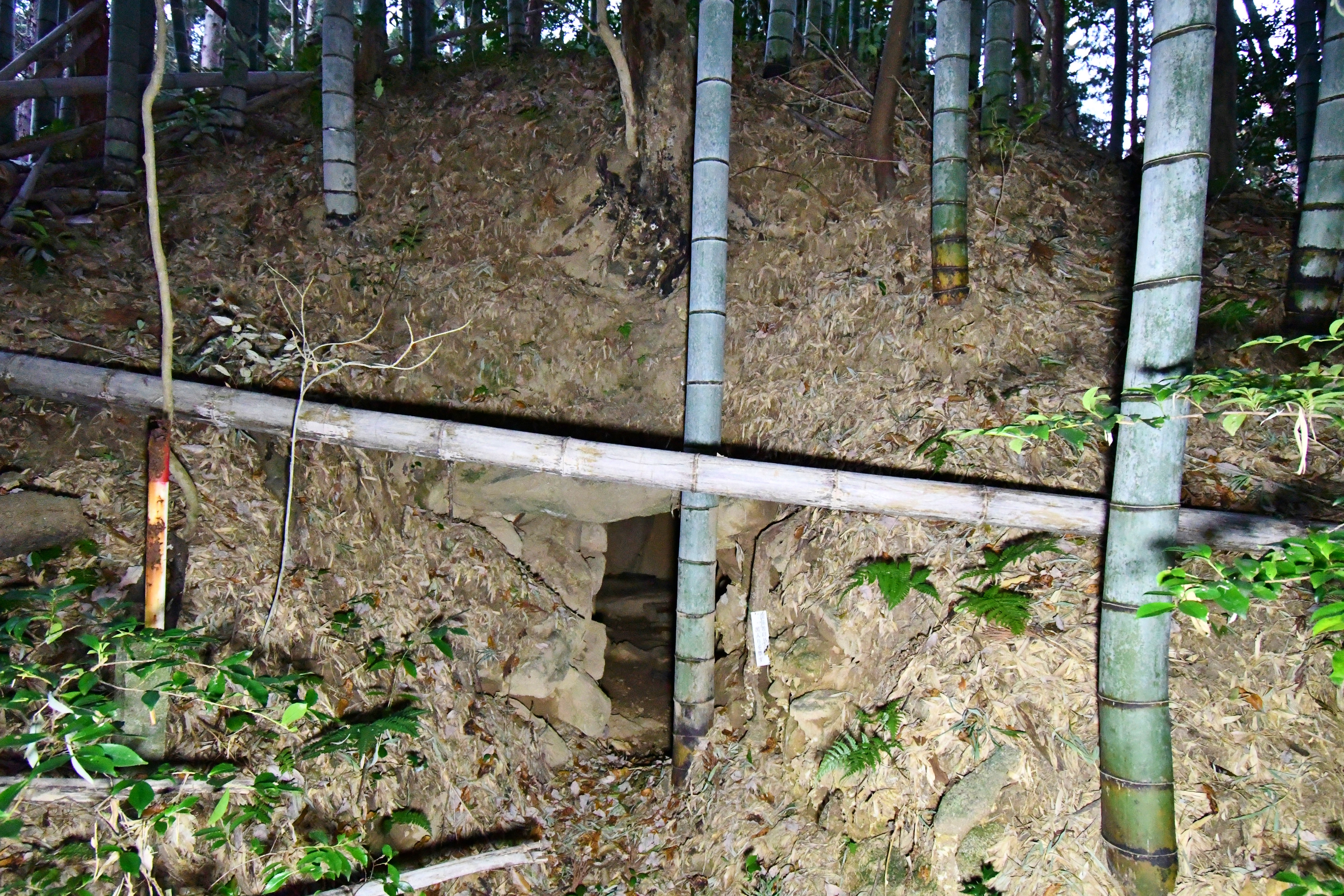
Goi Kofun No.2

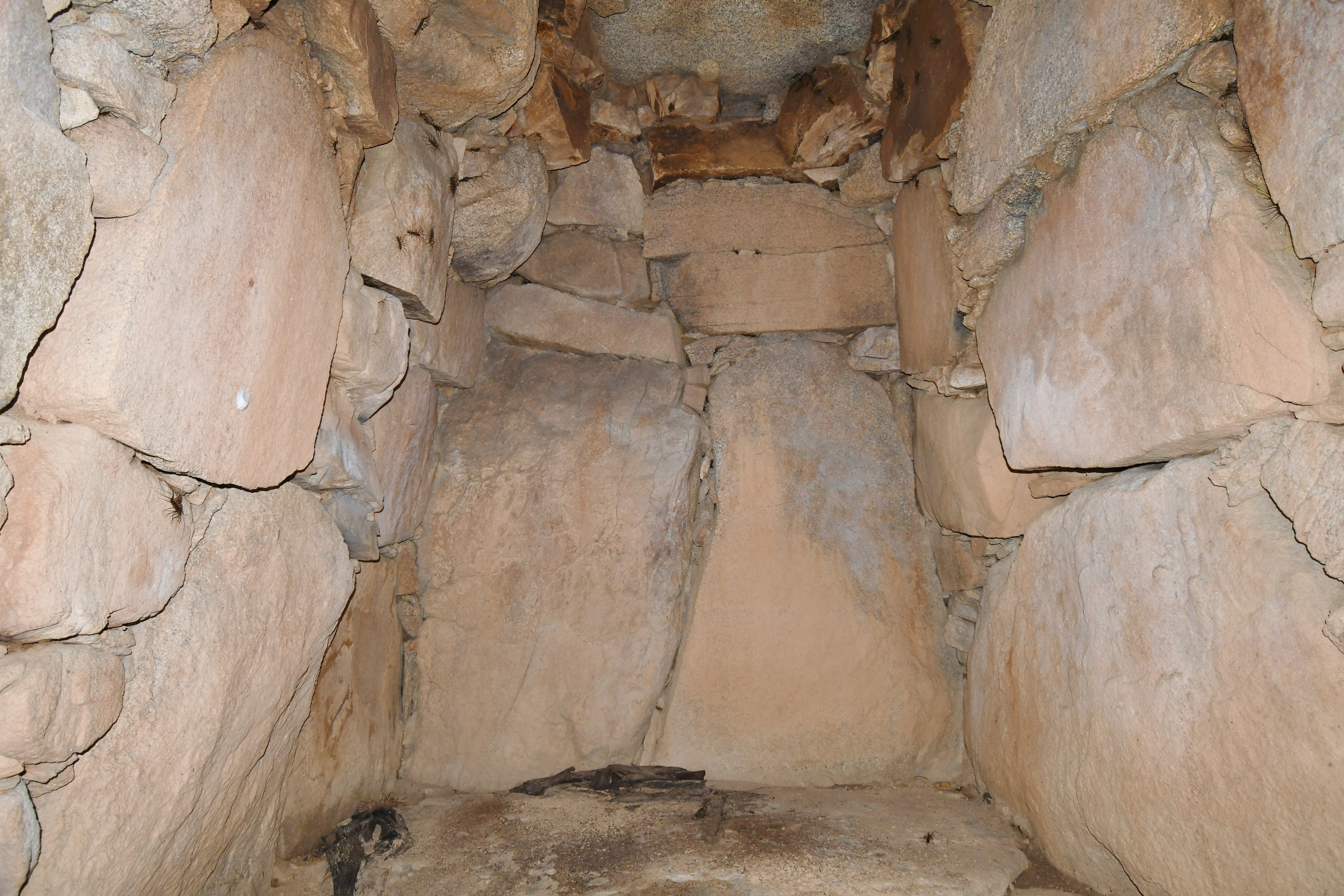
Burial Chamber (towards the back wall)

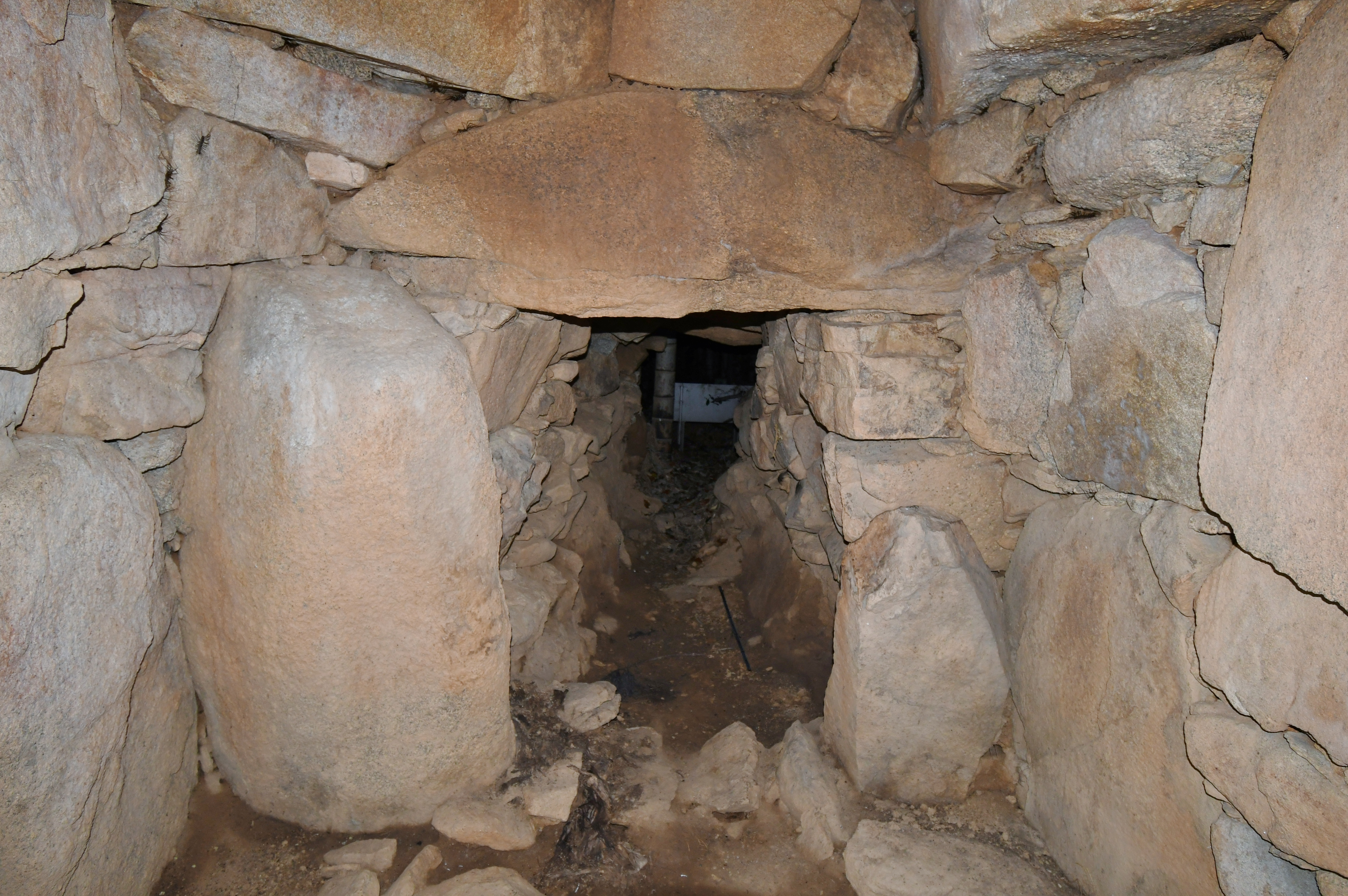
Burial Chamber (towards the opening)

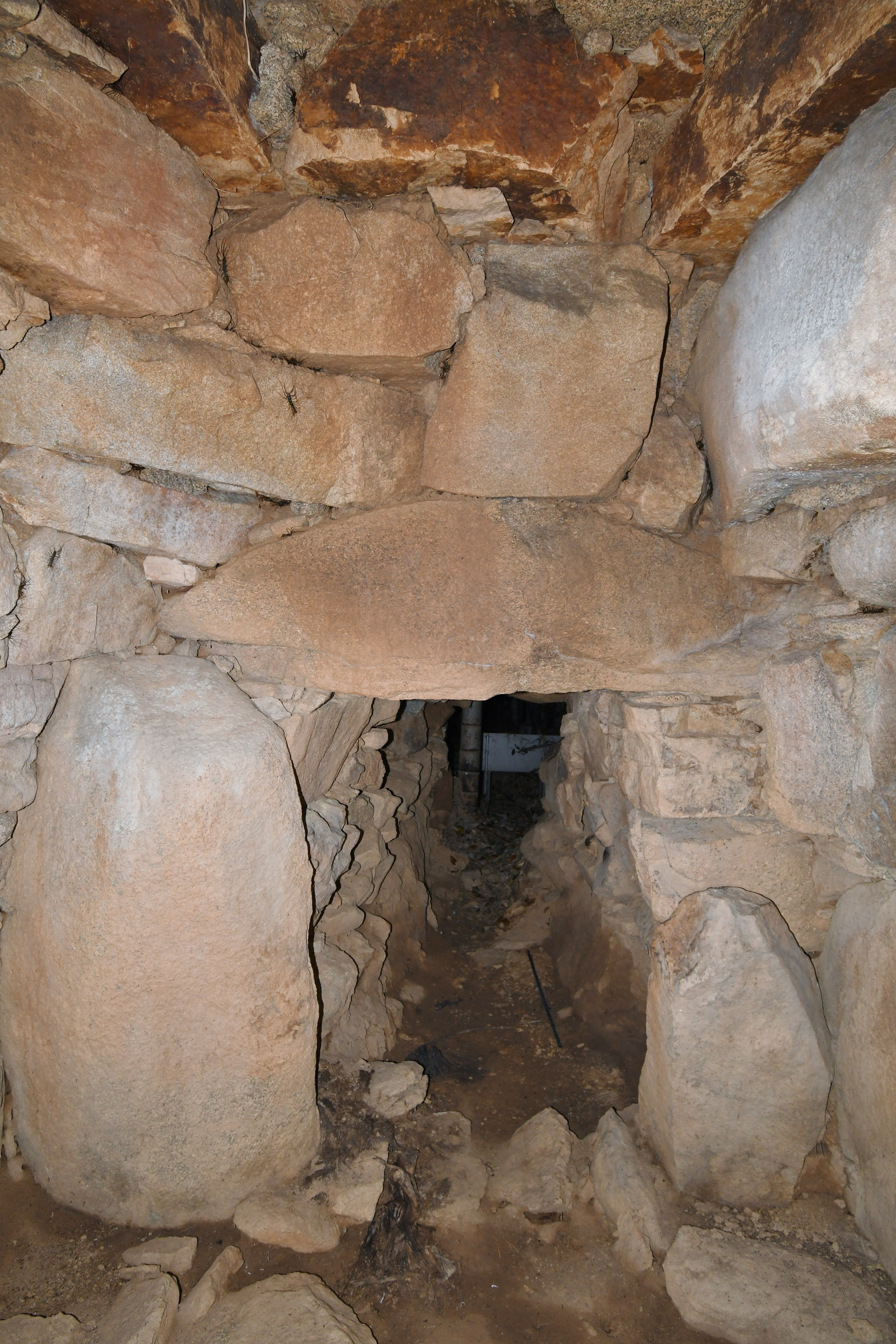
Burial Chamber (towards the opening)

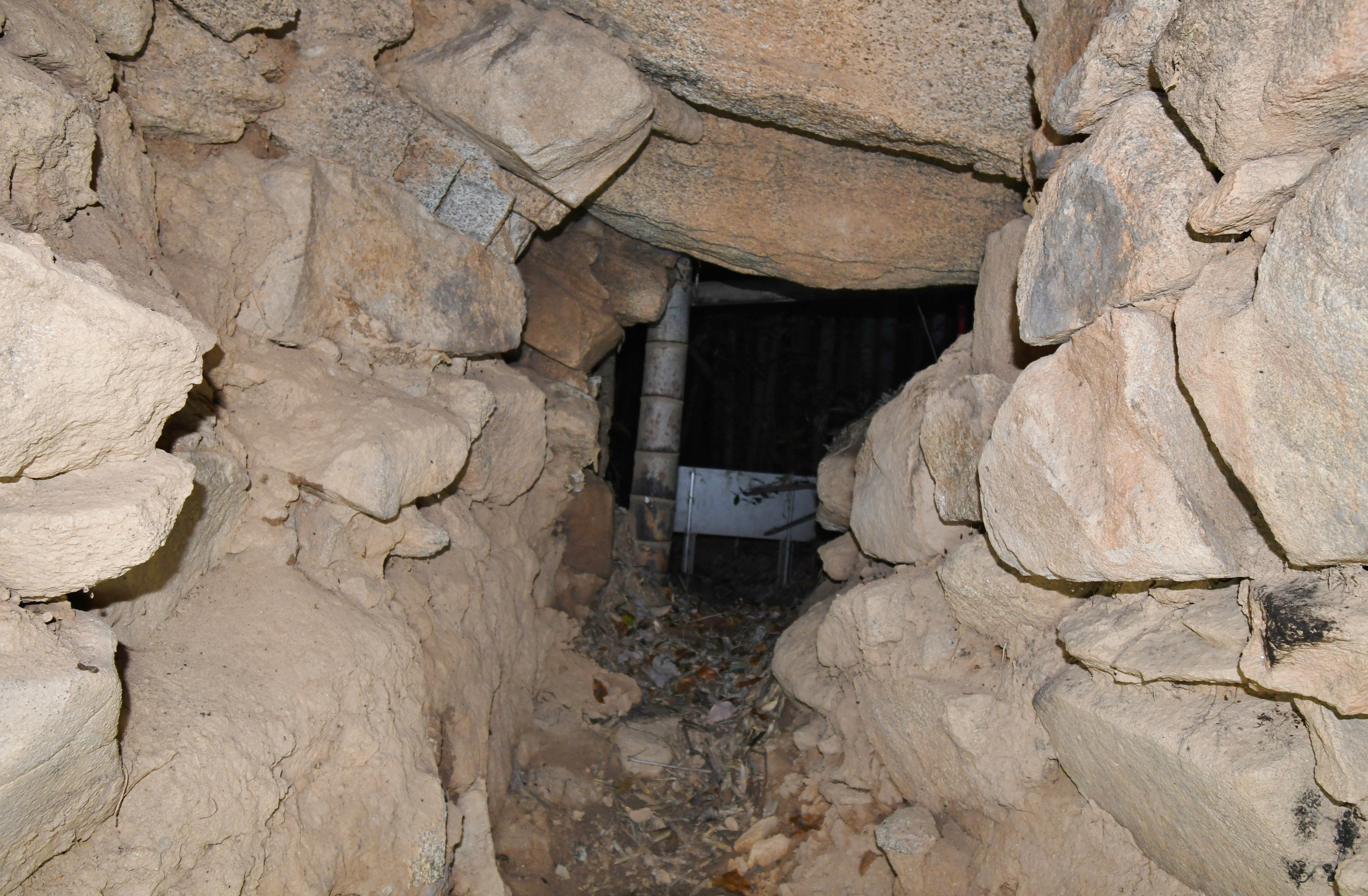
Entrance Passage (towards the opening)）

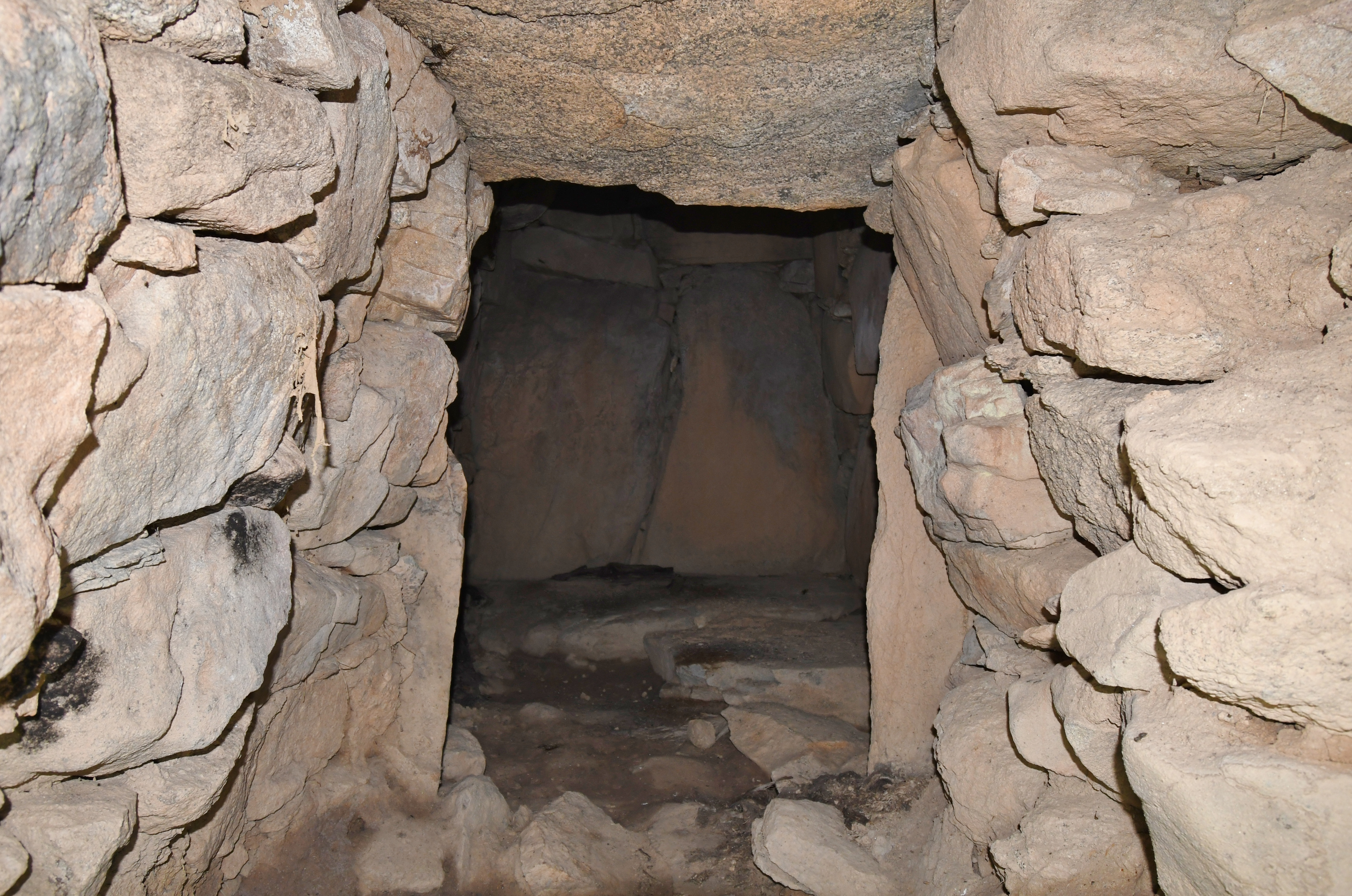
Entrance Passage (towards the burial chamber)

=== Kofun No. 3 ===
Kofun No. 3 was located approximately 30 meters below Kofun No. 1 and No. 2, but has now been destroyed. According to records of the 1911 excavation, it had a single-chambered horizontal-entry stone burial chamber with a total length of approximately 3.5 by 2.4 meters with a height of 1.8 meters at the back wall. The entrance passage was 4.2 by 0.9 meters with a height of 1.2 meters. The grave goods inside the burial chamber were excavated in their original positions and consisted of:

- Depression in the entrance passage: Five Sue ware bowls and lids arranged in two rows. Two contain freshwater mussels shellsed.
- Near the entrance: Sue ware, Haji ware, three gilded cloud-shaped ornaments, one iron sickle, one iron hand axe. There was a Haji ware crucible containing red pigment.
- Near the east wall of the burial chamber: 20 Sue ware bowls
- Near the west wall of the burial chamber: 1 iron tongs, 2 anvils, 1 whetstone, over 20 iron arrowheads, an iron sword, horse trappings.
- Near the back wall of the burial chamber: 1 iron sword, 1 Sue ware bowl.
- Near the coffin in the burial chamber: 1 jasper magatama, 1 glass magatama, 8 crystal faceted beads, over 10 small glass beads, over 20 talc mortar beads, over 400 clay beads.
- Others: 1 iron spear, 2 metal fittings.
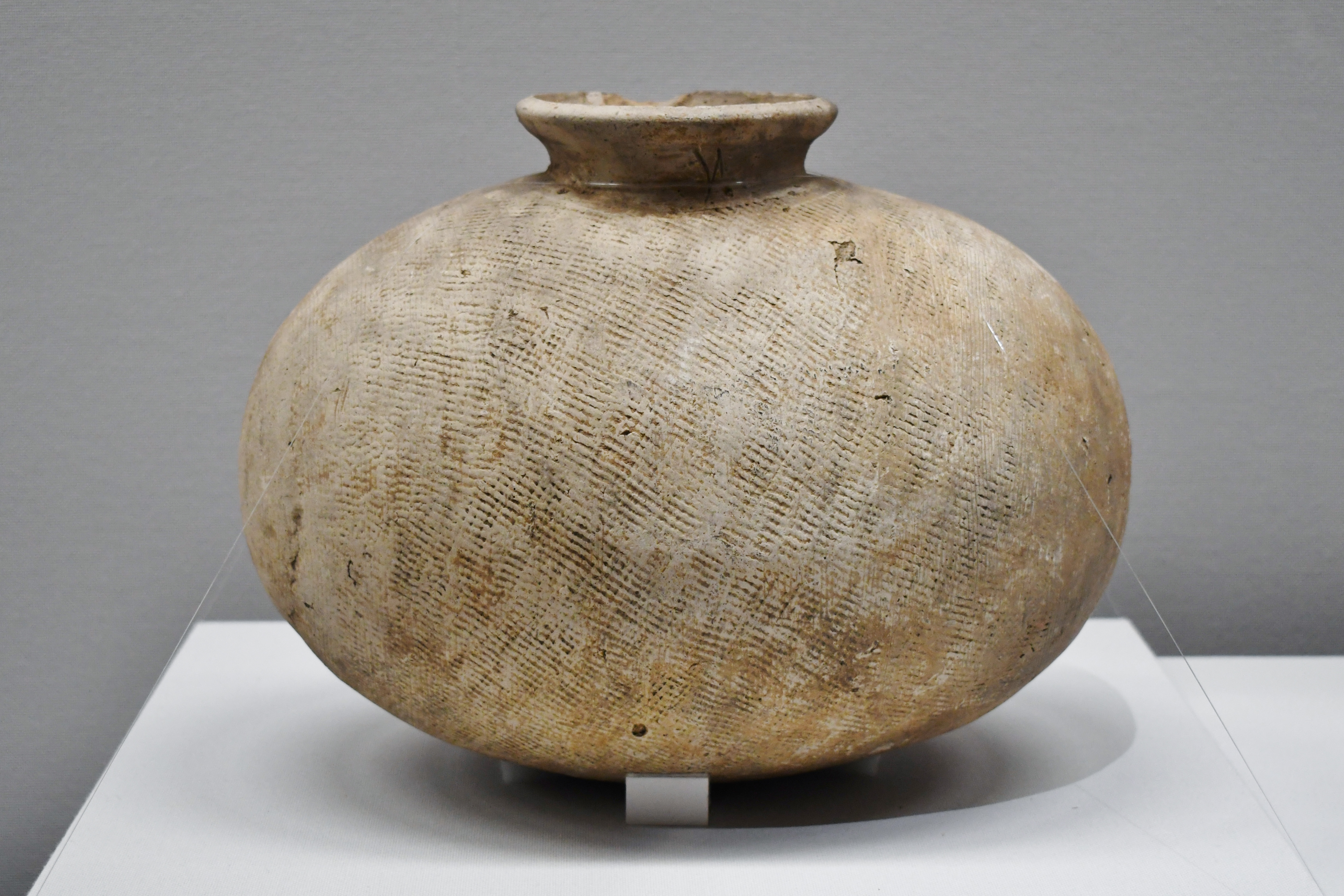
Horizontal bottle: On display at the Tokyo National Museum.

The Goi Kofun cluster about two kilometers northwest of Tabuse Station on the JR West San'yō Main Line.

== See also ==
- List of Historic Sites of Japan (Yamaguchi)
