= Mishima Jiikonbo Kofun Cluster =

Burial mound cluster in Yamaguchi, Japan

- 見島ジーコンボ古墳群 (Japanese)
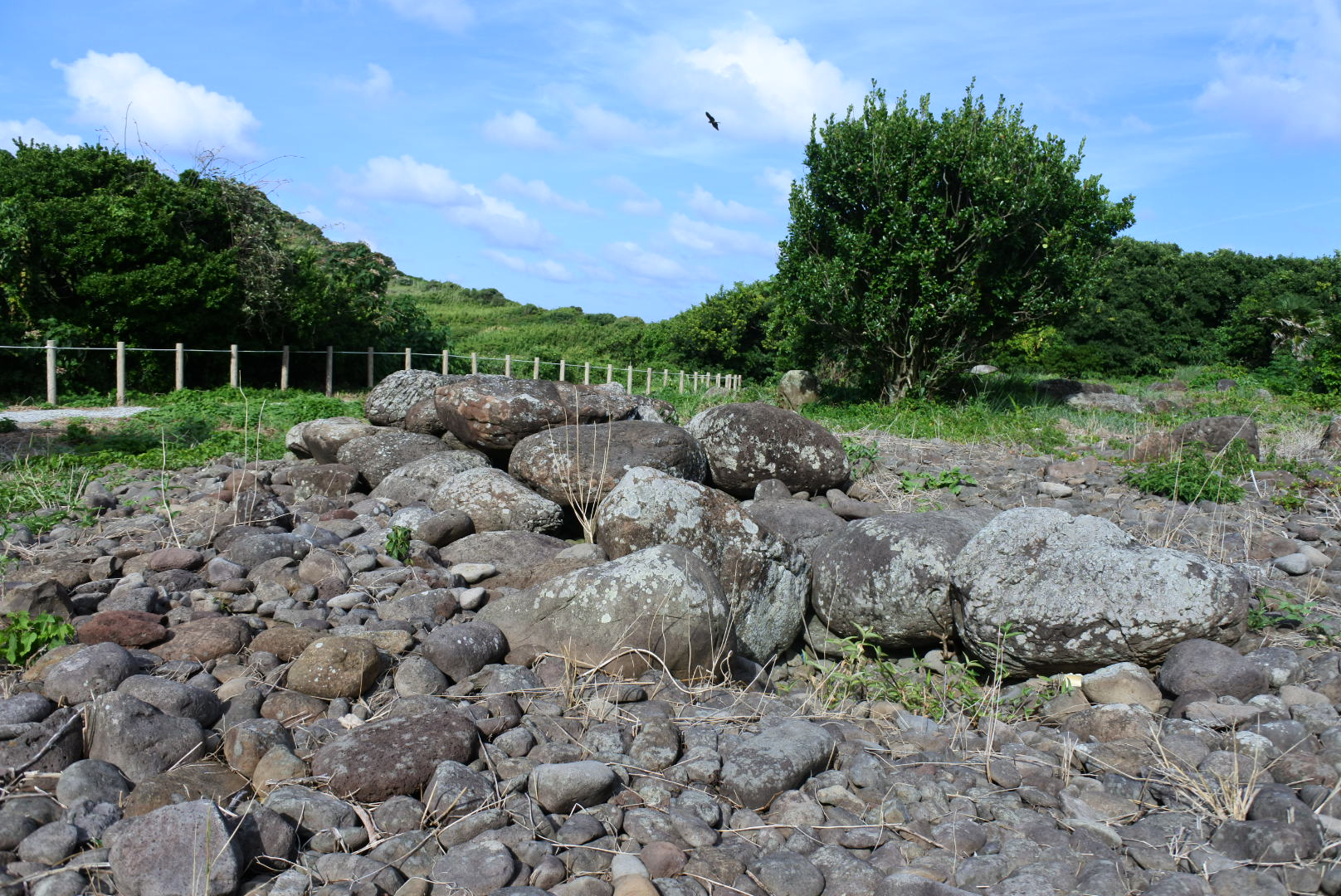
- Mishima Jiikonbo Kofun Cluster

- Mishima Jiikonbo Kofun Cluster Mishima Jiikonbo Kofun Cluster (Japan)
- 34°45′49″N 131°09′34″E
- Type: Burial Mound cluster
- Periods: Nara period
- Location: Hagi, Yamaguchi, Japan
- Region: San'yō region

History
- Built: 7th-8th century

Site notes
- Public access: Yes (no facilities)
- National Historic Site of Japan

The Mishima Jiikonbo Kofun Cluster (見島ジーコンボ古墳群) is a group of burial mounds, located on the island of Mishima in the city of Hagi, Yamaguchi in the San'yō region of Japan. The grave cluster was designated a National Historic Site of Japan in 1958, with the area under protection expanded in 1984.

== Overview ==
The Mishima Jiikonbo group of burial mounds is located on a gravel beach on the southeastern coast of Mishima Island, which located in the Sea of Japan, about 45 kilometers off the coast of Hagi. Approximately 200 ancient burial mounds are densely built on the Yokoura coastline from Mt. Takami to Mt. Bandai in Honmura, with a width of 50 to 100 meters extending for about 300 meters from east to west. All these burial mounds were made by piling up natural basalt stones from gravel beaches without the use of any soil. About 10% of the total number of burial mounds has been excavated, and have bene found to contain a horizontal burial chamber with a short passage and a wide, shallow box-type sarcophagus-like burial facility. These burial mounds are believed to date from the 8th to the 9th centuries, based on a number of coins which have been found with grave goods.

Excavated items include weapons such as iron swords and arrowheads, accessories such as gilt-bronze hairpins and small glass beads, earthenware such as green-glazed pottery and Haji ware, bronze products such as copper bells and copper mirrors. Because the combination of stacked stone mounds and burial goods is common to many Emishi mounds in Iwate Prefecture, and the characteristics of the burial accessories is rare for western Japan, and also considering the small size of the settlements on the island at the time, it is speculated that these are the graves of kondei, conscripted militia, who were dispatched to the island, possible from northern Japan, due to military tensions with Korea. the excavated items are in the Hagi Museum and the Yamaguchi Prefectural Archaeological Center.

== See also ==
- List of Historic Sites of Japan (Yamaguchi)
