= Hagi Domain Boat Shed =

- 旧萩藩御船倉 (Japanese)
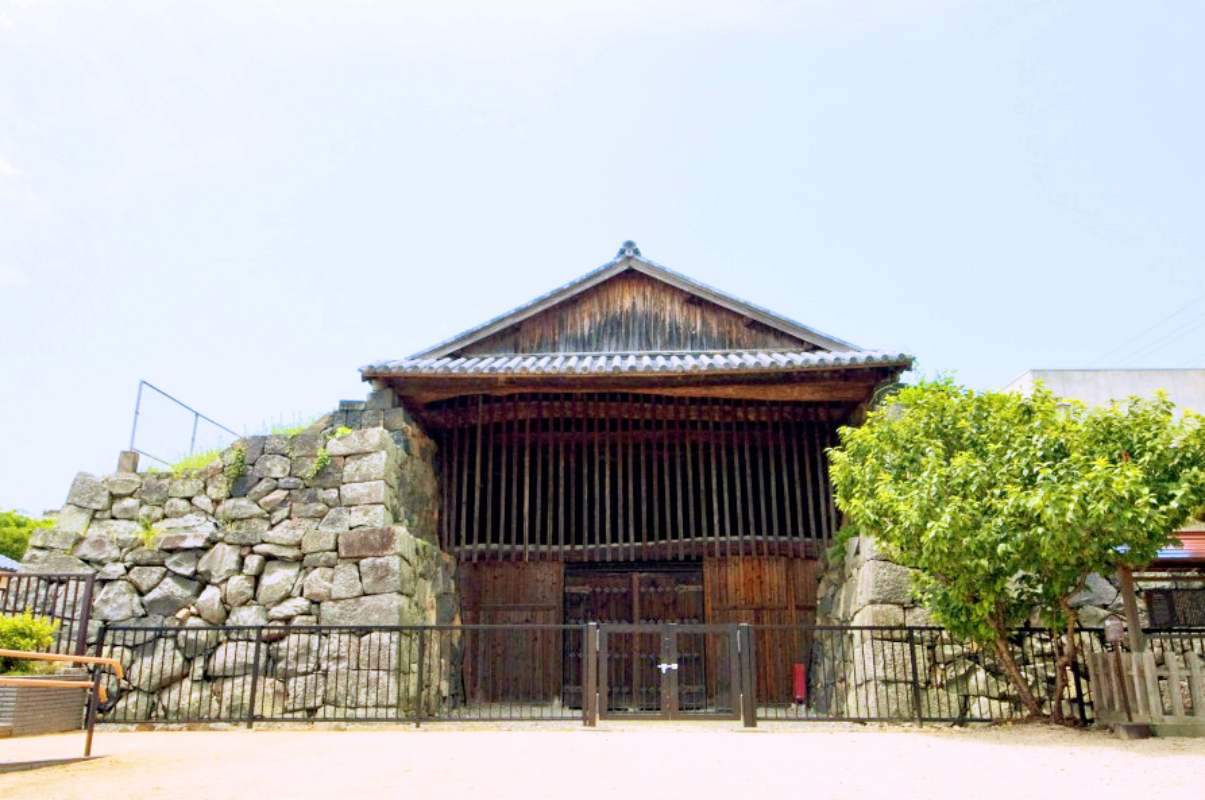

- Hagi Domain Boat Shed Hagi Domain Boat Shed (Japan)
- 34°25′14″N 131°24′04″E
- Type: Boat shed
- Location: Hagi, Yamaguchi, Japan

History
- Built: Chōshū Domain
- National Historic Site of Japan

The Hagi Domain Boat Shed (旧萩藩御船倉, kyū-Hagi-han ofunagura) is an Edo Period building located in the Higashi Hamazaki-chō neighborhood of the city of Hagi, Yamaguchi Prefecture, in the San'yō region of Japan. It was designated a National Historic Site in 1936.

== Overview ==
The Hagi Domain Boat Shed is a building which stored the barge of the daimyō of Chōshū Domain. It was built shortly after the construction of Hagi Castle in 1608. The Hagi Castle Town Illustrated Map (萩城下町絵図, Hagi jōkamachi ezu) created in the Kyōhō period (1716-1735) depicts a structure holding three boats, and the Yae Hagi Famous Places (八江萩名所図画) from the Tenpō period (1830-1843) depicts four ship holds. However, one building on the north side and one on the south side were demolished, and only the central structure remains today. The building has six-meter thick basalt walls on both sides and a gabled roof. It is 26.9 meters long, 8.8 meters wide and 8.8 meters high. Due to land reclamation after the Meiji period, it is no longer on the river bank, but when constructed, boats could freely enter and exit to the Matsumoto River. It is the only boat shed from the Edo Period to survive to the present day. It is located in an Important Preservation District for Groups of Traditional Buildings containing more than 40 buildings from the Edo Period, including the former Hagi Domain warehouse.

The interior is not normally open to the public.

== See also ==
- List of Historic Sites of Japan (Yamaguchi)
