= Asada Tumulus Cluster =

- 朝田墳墓群 (Japanese)
- Asada Tumulus Cluster Asada Tumulus Cluster (Japan)
- 34°09′17″N 131°25′56″E
- Type: burial mound
- Periods: Yayoi period
- Location: Yamaguchi, Yamaguchi, Japan
- Region: San'yō region

History
- Built: 1st century AD

Site notes
- Public access: Yes (no facilities)
- National Historic Site of Japan

Asada Tumulus Cluster (朝田墳墓群, Asada funbo-gun) is a group of Yayoi period burial mounds, located in the Asada and Yoshiki neighborhoods of the city of Yamaguchi, Yamaguchi Prefecture in the San'yō region of Japan. The tumulus group was collectively designated a National Historic Site of Japan in 1982.

== Overview ==
The Asada group of burial mounds is located at the tip of a hill with an elevation of 40 meters in the southwestern part of the Yamaguchi Basin, and dates from the late Yayoi period into the early Kofun period. The site was discovered with the construction of the Japan National Route 9 Yamaguchi Bypass, and more than 300 graves were discovered during rescue archaeology excavations conducted from 1975. The burial mounds were divided into four districts, but only the northernmost district, District I, remains and was designated as a historic site. The other areas were removed for road construction and no trace now remains.

The diversity and number of tombs made it an important site for understanding the transition from group tombs in the Yayoi period to individual tombs in the Kofun period and the social structure of the time. The remaining District I contains 13 box-type stone coffins from the late Yayoi period to the end of the Yayoi period, four earthen tombs with stone lids, 12 earthen tombs, four jar coffin tombs, and one square trapezoidal tumulus and six circular platform-shaped tombs from the early Kofun period, and one each of the lateral pit-type stone burial chamber tumuli from the late Kofun period. Currently, the site is maintained as the Asada Burial Mounds Park above the Asada Tunnel on National Route 9, and although the actual burial mounds were backfilled, reconstructions have been restored above ground. The site is about 25 minutes on foot from Yabara Station on the JR West Yamaguchi Line.

== See also ==
- List of Historic Sites of Japan (Yamaguchi)
