= Shimofuri Castle =

Castle ruins in Ube, Yamaguchi, Japan

- 霜降城
- Ube, Yamaguchi, Japan
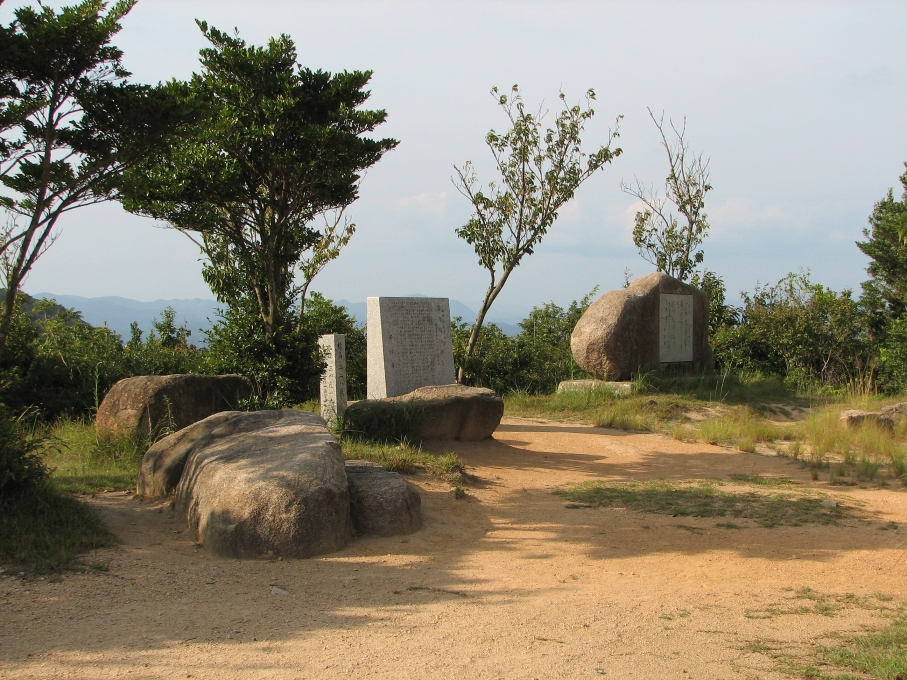
- Shimofuri Castle ruins

Site information
- Type: yamajiro-style Japanese castle
- Controlled by: Imagawa clan, Takeda clan, Tokugawa clan
- Condition: ruins

Location
- Shimofuri Castle Shimofuri Castle (Japan)
- Coordinates: 34°00′57.61″N 131°15′27.99″E

Site history
- Built: c.1179
- Built by: Koto Takemitsu
- Demolished: 1358
- Yamaguchi Prefecture Historic Site

Shimofuri Castle (霜降城, Shimofuri-jō) was a Nanboku-chō period yamajiro-style Japanese castle located in what is now the city of Ube, Yamaguchi Prefecture, Japan. The ruins have been protected as a Yamaguchi Prefectural Historic Site since 1968.

== History ==
Shimofuri Castle was a typical yamajiro fortress built to take advantage of the uneven terrain of a mountain, making it difficult for enemies to attack. Near the summit, there are numerous interconnected enclosures (kuruwa) protected by earthen ramparts and dry moats. Mountain castles were only used during wartime; normally, people lived on the flat land at the foot of the mountain. The castle grounds extended approximately 660 meters from north to south, with the main castle located on the highest of the four peaks of Mount Shimofuri (approximately 250 meters above sea level), and the front castle (247 meters above sea level) and the rear castle (240 meters and 235 meters above sea level). This made it one of the largest mountain castles in Yamaguchi Prefecture.

The Kotō clan, a powerful family from Asa District in Nagato Province which claimed descent from the Mononobe clan, and who served as the shugo of Nagato Province at their peak, were the castle's lords from its construction to its abandonment. It is said that Shimofuri Castle was built around 1179 by Kotō Takemitsu, the 7th head of the Kotō clan, who gained fame at the Battle of Dan-no-ura in the service of Minamoto no Yoritomo. The castle served as the emergency stronghold for the clan, whose residence and the administrative center of Nagato Province was located at the foot of the mountain.

Later, the Koto clan came into conflict with the Ōuchi clan the rulers of Suō Province, and engaged in repeated clashes. However, in 1358, Koto Yoshitake (17th head of the Koto clan) was unable to withstand the attack of Ōuchi Hiroyo, and the Shimofuri Castle fell. Kotō Yoshitake fled to Kyushu from which he unsuccessfully attempted to reclaim his lost territory, but ultimately Nagato Province was incorporated into the Ōuchi clan's territory.

Because Shimofuri Castle was not used by the Ōuchi clan, it fell into ruins, and remains from the Nanboku-chō period still exist today. The castle ruins are a 7.3 kilometers from JR West San'yō Main Line Kotō Station.

== See also ==
- List of Historic Sites of Japan (Yamaguchi)
