= Kajikurihama Site =

Yayoi period cemetery in Yamaguchi, Japan

Kajikurihama site
- 梶栗浜遺跡 (Japanese)
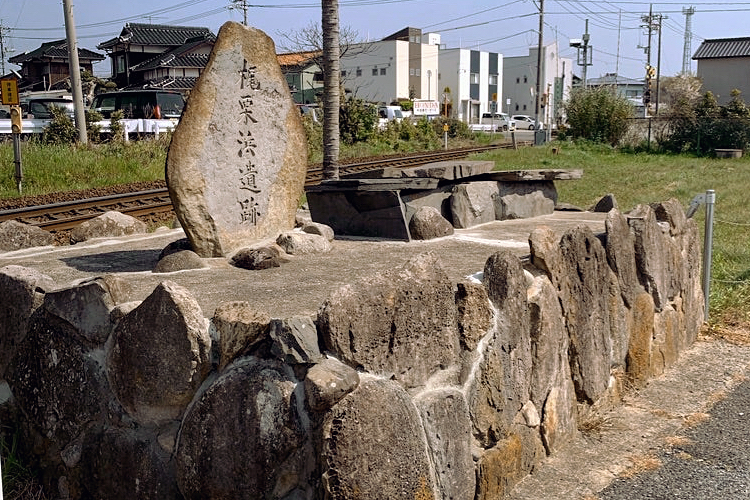
- Kajikurihama site

- Kajikurihama site Kajikurihama Site (Japan)
- Interactive map of Kajikurihama site
- 34°01′00″N 130°55′23″E
- Type: cemetery trace
- Periods: Yayoi period
- Location: Shimonoseki, Yamaguchi, Japan
- Region: San'yō region

Site notes
- Public access: Yes (no facilities)

The Kajikurihama Site (梶栗浜遺跡, Kajikurihama iseki) is an archaeological site with a Yayoi period cemetery located in the Kajikurichō neighborhood of the city of Shimonoseki, Yamaguchi Prefecture, in the San'yō region of Japan. It was designated a National Historic Site in 1980.

== Overview ==
The Kajikurihama site is located 500 meters from the present-day coast of Hibiki Bay, extending north–south at an elevation of 3.5 meters. It was discovered in 1913, during the construction of the Chōshū Railway (now the San'in Main Line) when a box-type sarcophagus was unearthed. In subsequent archaeological excavations in 1932 and 1935, narrow bronze swords, possibly imported from the Korean Peninsula were discovered, along with additional graves, and in 1957 Yayoi pottery dating the site to the mid-Yayoi period was found. Other grave goods included a multi-pronged bronze mirror and a ceremonial bronze sword. The cemetery is located approximately 400 meters to the north of the Ayaragigō Site, but the connection between the settlement and this cemetery is uncertain.

The site is about an eight-minute walk from Kajikuri-Gōdaichi Station on the JR West Sanin Main Line.

== See also ==
- List of Historic Sites of Japan (Yamaguchi)
