= List of historic sites of Japan (Yamaguchi) =

This list is of the historic sites of Japan located within the Prefecture of Yamaguchi.

== National Historic Sites ==
As of 1 July 2019, forty-three Sites have been designated as being of national significance.

Site	Municipality	Comments	Image	Coordinates	Type	Ref.
Ayaragigō Site 綾羅木郷遺跡 Ayaragigō iseki	Shimonoseki	Yayoi period settlement trace	Ayaragigō Site	34°00′45″N 130°55′28″E	1	2435
Itō Hirobumi former residence 伊藤博文旧宅 Itō Hirobumi kyū-taku	Hagi	Edo Period residence	Itō Hirobumi former residence	34°24′40″N 131°25′05″E	8	2396
Kajikurihama Site 梶栗浜遺跡 Kajikurihama iseki	Shimonoseki	Yayoi period cemetery	Kajikurihama ruins	34°01′00″N 130°55′23″E	1	2438
Yoshida Shōin Imprisonment Site 吉田松陰幽囚の旧宅 Yoshida Shōin yūshū kyū-taku	Hagi		Yoshida Shōin Imprisonment Site	34°24′44″N 131°25′04″E	8	2367
Former Hagi Domain Boat Shed 旧萩藩御船倉 kyū-Hagi-han ofunagura	Hagi	Edo period structure	Former Hagi Domain Boat Shed	34°25′14″N 131°24′04″E	6	2413
Former Hagi Domain School - Meirinkan 旧萩藩校明倫館 kyū-Hagi-hankō Meirinkan	Hagi	former han school	Former Hagi Domain School Meirinkan	34°24′33″N 131°23′56″E	4	2392
Mishima Jiikonbo Kofun Cluster 見島ジーコンボ古墳群 Mishima Jiikonbo kofun-gun	Hagi	Nara period cemetery	Mishima Jiikonbo Kofun Cluster	34°45′49″N 131°09′35″E	1	2443
Takasugi Shinsaku grave 高杉晋作墓 Takasugi Shinsaku no haka	Shimonoseki	Bakumatsu period patriot grave	Takasugi Shinsaku grave	34°05′08″N 131°04′18″E	7	2401
Saba River Sekimizu ruins 佐波川関水 Saba-gawa sekimizu	Yamaguchi	Kamakura period weir on the Sabagawa River	Sabagawa Sekimizu ruins	34°16′14″N 131°39′25″E	6	2416
Suō Kokubun-ji ruins 周防国分寺旧境内 Suō Kokubunji kyū-keidai	Hōfu	Nara period provincial temple of Suō Province	Suō Kokubun-ji ruins	34°03′42″N 131°34′46″E	3	2429
Suō Provincial Capital ruins 周防国衙跡 Suō Kokuga ato	Hōfu	Nara period kokufu of Suō Province	Suō Provincial Capital ruins	34°03′28″N 131°35′11″E	2	2415
Suō Mint ruins 周防鋳銭司跡 Suō no juzenji ato	Yamaguchi	Heian period industrial site	Suō Mint	34°05′10″N 131°26′39″E	6	2437
Suō-nada Sluice Sites 周防灘干拓遺跡 Suō-nada kantaku iseki	San'yō-Onoda, Yamaguchi			33°59′50″N 131°09′59″E	6	2446
Shōkasonjuku Academy 松下村塾 Shōkasonjuku	Hagi	run by Yoshida Shōin; inscribed on the UNESCO World Heritage List as one of Sites of Japan’s Meiji Industrial Revolution: Iron and Steel, Shipbuilding and Coal Mining	Shōkasonjuku Academy	34°24′44″N 131°25′02″E	4	2366
Jōei-ji Gardens 常栄寺庭園 Jōeiji teien	Yamaguchi	Muromachi period Japanese garden; also a Place of Scenic Beauty	Jōei-ji gardens	34°11′54″N 131°29′22″E	8	2376
Jinbayama Kofun 仁馬山古墳 Jinbayama kofun	Shimonoseki	Kofun period tumulus		34°00′50″N 130°56′33″E	1	2445
Ōmijima Whale Grave 青海島鯨墓 Ōmijima kujira haka	Nagato		Ōmijima Whale Grave	34°25′28″N 34°25′28″E	6, 7	2408
Iwakisan Kōgoishi ruins 石城山神籠石 Iwakisan Kōgoishi	Hikari	Asuka period fortification	Iwakisan Kōgoishi	33°59′14″N 132°02′15″E	1	2405
Murata Seifū former residence and grave 村田清風旧宅および墓 Murata Seifū kyū-taku oyobi haka	Nagato	Bakumatsu period reformer		34°22′10″N 131°12′53″E	7, 8	2418
Ōmura Masujirō grave 大村益次郎墓 Ōmura Masujirō no haka	Yamaguchi	Bakumatsu period patriot grave	Ōmura Masujirō grave	34°04′44″N 131°27′56″E	7	2406
Ōuchi clan residence and Ryōun-ji ruins 大内氏遺跡附凌雲寺跡 Ōuchi-shi iseki tsuketari Ryōunji ato	Yamaguchi	Kofun period tumulus	Ōuchi clan residence and Ryōun-ji ruins	34°11′04″N 131°28′47″E	2, 3	2431
Dainichi Kofun 大日古墳 Dainichi kofun	Hōfu	Kofun period tumulus	Dainichi kofun	34°04′20″N 131°32′51″E	1	2424
Ōhibi Natsumikan 大日比ナツミカン原樹 Ōhibi natsumikan genju	Nagato	also a Natural Monument	Ōhibi Natsumikan	34°24′45″N 131°12′27″E	6	2383
Yanai Chausuyama Kofun 茶臼山古墳 Yanai Chausuyama kofun	Yanai	Kofun period tumulus	Chausuyama Kofun	33°57′55″N 132°07′44″E	1	2423
Nakayama Tadamitsu grave 中山忠光墓 Nakayama Tadamitsu no haka	Shimonoseki	Bakumatsu period patriot grave	Nakayama Tadamitsu grave	34°00′25″N 130°55′05″E	7	2419
Asada Tumulus Cluster 朝田墳墓群 Asada funbogun	Yamaguchi	Yayoi period tumuli cluster		34°09′17″N 131°25′56″E	1	2441
Chōshū Domain Shimonoseki Maeda Battery Site 長州藩下関前田台場跡 Chōshū-han Shimonoseki Maeda daiba ato	Shimonoseki	Bakumatsu period fortification; the lower battery was captured during the Shimonoseki Campaign (photograph by Felice Beato)	Chōshū Domain Shimonoseki Maeda Battery Site	33°58′27″N 130°58′17″E	2	00003682
Naganobori Copper Mine site 長登銅山跡 Naganobori dōzan ato	Mine	copper mine from Nara period to modern era	Naganobori Copper Mine	34°14′40″N 131°20′10″E	6	3368
Nagato Mint 長門鋳銭所跡 Nagato no juzensho ato	Shimonoseki	Nara period industrial site	Nagato Mint	34°00′01″N 130°58′57″E	6	2391
Doigahama Site 土井ヶ浜遺跡 Doigahama iseki	Shimonoseki	Yayoi period necropolis		34°17′37″N 130°53′09″E	6	2433
Suenosue Kiln ruins 陶陶窯跡 Suenosue kama ato	Yamaguchi	Heian period industrial site		34°05′57″N 131°25′14″E	6	2422
Hagi Road 萩往還 Hagi ōkan	Yamaguchi, Hagi, Hōfu	Edo Period road remnants	Hagi Road	34°02′36″N 131°34′25″E	6	2444
Hagi Castle Town 萩城城下町 Hagi-jō jōkamachi	Hagi	Edo Period castle town inscribed on the UNESCO World Heritage List as one of Sites of Japan’s Meiji Industrial Revolution: Iron and Steel, Shipbuilding and Coal Mining; see also Groups of Traditional Buildings	Hagi Castle Town	34°24′43″N 131°23′38″E	2, 6	2434
Hagi Castle ruins 萩城跡 Hagi-jō ato	Hagi	Edo period castle inscribed on the UNESCO World Heritage List as one of Sites of Japan’s Meiji Industrial Revolution: Iron and Steel, Shipbuilding and Coal Mining	Hagi Castle	34°25′03″N 131°22′57″E	2	2425
Hagi Reverberatory Furnace 萩反射炉 Hagi hansharo	Hagi	Bakumatsu Period industrial site inscribed on the UNESCO World Heritage List as one of Sites of Japan’s Meiji Industrial Revolution: Iron and Steel, Shipbuilding and Coal Mining	Hagi Reverberatory Furnace	34°25′43″N 131°25′06″E	6	2373
Hagi Domain Mōri clan cemeteries 萩藩主毛利家墓所 Hagi-han-shu Mōri-ke bosho	Hagi, Yamaguchi	at the former Tenju-in (天樹院), Daishō-in (大照院), and Tōkō-ji (東光寺) in Hagi and Rurikō-ji (瑠璃光寺) in Yamaguchi	Hagi Domain Mōri clan cemeteries	34°23′41″N 131°23′28″E	7	2439
Shirasu Tatara Ironworks ruins 白須たたら製鉄遺跡 Shirasu tatara seitetsu iseki	Abu	Edo period industrial ruins		34°35′09″N 131°35′25″E	6	2440
Shikiyama Castle ruins 敷山城跡 Shikiyama-jo ato	Hōfu	Nanboku-cho period castle ruins	Shikiyama Castle ruins	34°04′56″N 131°35′43″E	2	2404
Kido Takayoshi former residence 木戸孝允旧宅 Kido Takayoshi kyū-taku	Hagi	Edo Period residence	Kido Takayoshi former residence	34°24′44″N 131°23′41″E	8	2395
Notani Stone Bath ruins 野谷石風呂 Notani no ishiburo	Yamaguchi	Kamakura period steam bath ruins		34°17′02″N 131°39′00″E	5	2407
Ohitayama Tatara Iron Works ruins 大板山たたら製鉄遺跡 Ōitayama tatara seitetsu iseki	Hagi	Bakumatsu period industrial site	Ōitayama tatara ironworks	34°24′29″N 131°23′57″E	6	3762
Ebisugahana Shipyard site 恵美須ヶ鼻造船所跡 Ebisugahana zōsenjo ato	Hagi	Bakumatsu period industrial site	Ebisugahana Shipyard site	34°25′51″N 131°24′44″E	6	3719
Katsuyama Goten ruins 勝山御殿跡 Katsuyama goten ato	Shimonoseki		Katsuyama Goten ruins	34°01′19″N 130°58′24″E	20	00004061

== Prefectural Historic Sites ==
As of 1 May 2018, thirty-one Sites have been designated as being of prefectural importance.

Site	Municipality	Comments	Image	Coordinates	Type	Ref.
Nakanohama Site 中ノ浜遺跡; Nakanohama iseki	Shimonoseki			34°09′20″N 130°54′58″E		
Kuroiichinosei Ichirizuka 黒井一ノ瀬一里塚; Kuroiichinosei ichirizuka	Shimonoseki			34°06′15″N 130°55′18″E		
Chōfu Domain Mōri Clan Cemetery 長府藩主毛利家墓所; Chōfu-han-shu Mōri-ke bosho	Shimonoseki	at Kōzan-ji, Shōzan-ji (笑山寺), Kakuon-ji (覚苑寺), and Sengaku-ji (泉岳寺)		33°59′46″N 130°58′55″E		
Shōei-ji Earthworks and Former Precinct 勝栄寺土塁及び旧境内; Shōeiji dorui oyobi kyū-keidai	Shūnan			34°04′14″N 131°45′58″E		
Wakayama Castle Site 若山城跡; Wakayama-jō ato	Shūnan			34°04′14″N 131°45′58″E		
Chōon Cave 潮音洞; Chōon-dō	Shūnan			34°14′07″N 131°48′54″E		
Shimofuri Castle ruins 霜降城跡; Shimofuri-jō ato	Ube			34°00′58″N 131°15′28″E		
Aratakisan Castle ruins 荒滝山城跡; Aratakisan-jō ato	Ube			34°09′11″N 131°17′49″E		
Ōuchihikami Kofun 大内氷上古墳; Ōuchihikami kofun	Yamaguchi			34°09′56″N 131°29′50″E		
Momotani Kiln Site 百谷窯跡; Momotani kama ato	Yamaguchi			34°06′12″N 131°24′45″E		
Onoda Cement Tokkuri Kiln 小野田セメント徳利窯; Onoda semento tokkuri-gama	Sanyō-Onoda			33°58′36″N 131°10′23″E		
Chōkōjiyama Kofun 長光寺山古墳; Chōkōjiyama kofun	Sanyō-Onoda			34°02′45″N 131°08′54″E		
Iwakuni Domain Kikkawa Clan Graves 岩国藩主吉川家墓所; Iwakuni-han-shu Kikkawa-ke bosho	Iwakuni			34°10′08″N 132°10′22″E		
Nakanokawayama Ichirizuka 中ノ川山一里塚; Nakanokawayama ichirizuka	Iwakuni			34°18′03″N 132°03′31″E		
Jingayama Kofun 神花山古墳; Jingayama kofun	Hirao			33°54′39″N 132°03′30″E		
Shiratori Kofun 白鳥古墳付陪塚及び周濠; Shiratori kofun tsuketari baizuka oyobi shūgō	Hirao			33°53′50″N 132°04′45″E		
Iwata Site 岩田遺跡; Iwata iseki	Hirao			33°53′38″N 132°04′48″E		
Kunimori Kofun 国森古墳; Kunimori kofun	Tabuse			33°57′31″N 132°01′24″E		
Goi Kofun cluster 後井古墳群; Goi kofun-gun	Tabuse			33°57′42″N 132°01′40″E		
Suebara Kiln Sites 末原窯跡群; Suebara kama ato-gun	Mine			34°17′34″N 131°20′27″E		
Susa-Karatsu Old Kiln Sites 須佐唐津古窯跡群; Susa-Karatsu ko-yōseki-gun	Hagi			34°35′35″N 131°37′11″E		
Anakannon Kofun 穴観音古墳; Anakannon kofun	Hagi			34°27′49″N 131°36′15″E		
Hagi Ware Old Kiln Sites 萩焼古窯跡群; Hagi-yaki ko-yōseki-gun	Hagi			34°25′07″N 131°26′01″E		
Oku-Abu Saiban Site 奥阿武宰判勘場跡; Oku-Abu Saiban kanba ato	Hagi			34°26′38″N 131°35′24″E		
Ōuchi Yoshitaka Chief Retainer Grave Site 大内義隆主従の墓所; Ōuchi Yoshitaka shujū no bosho	Nagato	in the grounds of Tainei-ji (大寧寺)		34°19′41″N 131°09′47″E		
Hekitaoyama Sue Ware Kiln Site 日置峠山の須恵器窯跡; Hekitaoyama no Sue-ki kama ato	Nagato			34°22′57″N 131°05′08″E		
Tainei-ji Precinct 大寧寺境内; Taineiji keidai	Nagato			34°19′42″N 131°09′46″E		
Hagi Ware Fukagawa Old Kiln Sites 萩焼深川古窯跡群; Hagi-yaki Fukagawa ko-yōseki-gun	Nagato			34°19′13″N 131°10′31″E		
Hōfu Tenman-gū Daisenbō Site 防府天満宮大専坊跡; Hōfu Tenmangū Daisenbō ato	Hōfu			34°03′48″N 131°34′27″E		
Nun Nomura Motoni House and Grave 野村望東尼終焉の宅及び宅跡並びに墓; Nomura Mōtōni shūen no taku oyobi taku ato narabini haka	Hōfu			34°02′44″N 131°33′50″E		
Ōyama Jinja Sutra Mound 御山神社経塚; Ōyama Jinja kyōzuka	Abu			34°34′49″N 131°33′33″E		

== Municipal Historic Sites ==
As of 1 May 2018, a further one hundred and thirty-five Sites have been designated as being of municipal importance.

== See also ==
- Cultural Properties of Japan
- Suō Province
- Nagato Province
- Yamaguchi Prefectural Museum
- List of Cultural Properties of Japan - paintings (Yamaguchi)
- List of Places of Scenic Beauty of Japan (Yamaguchi)
