= Jingayama Kofun =

Kofun period burial mound in Hirao, Yamaguchi, Japan

- 神花山古墳 (Japanese)
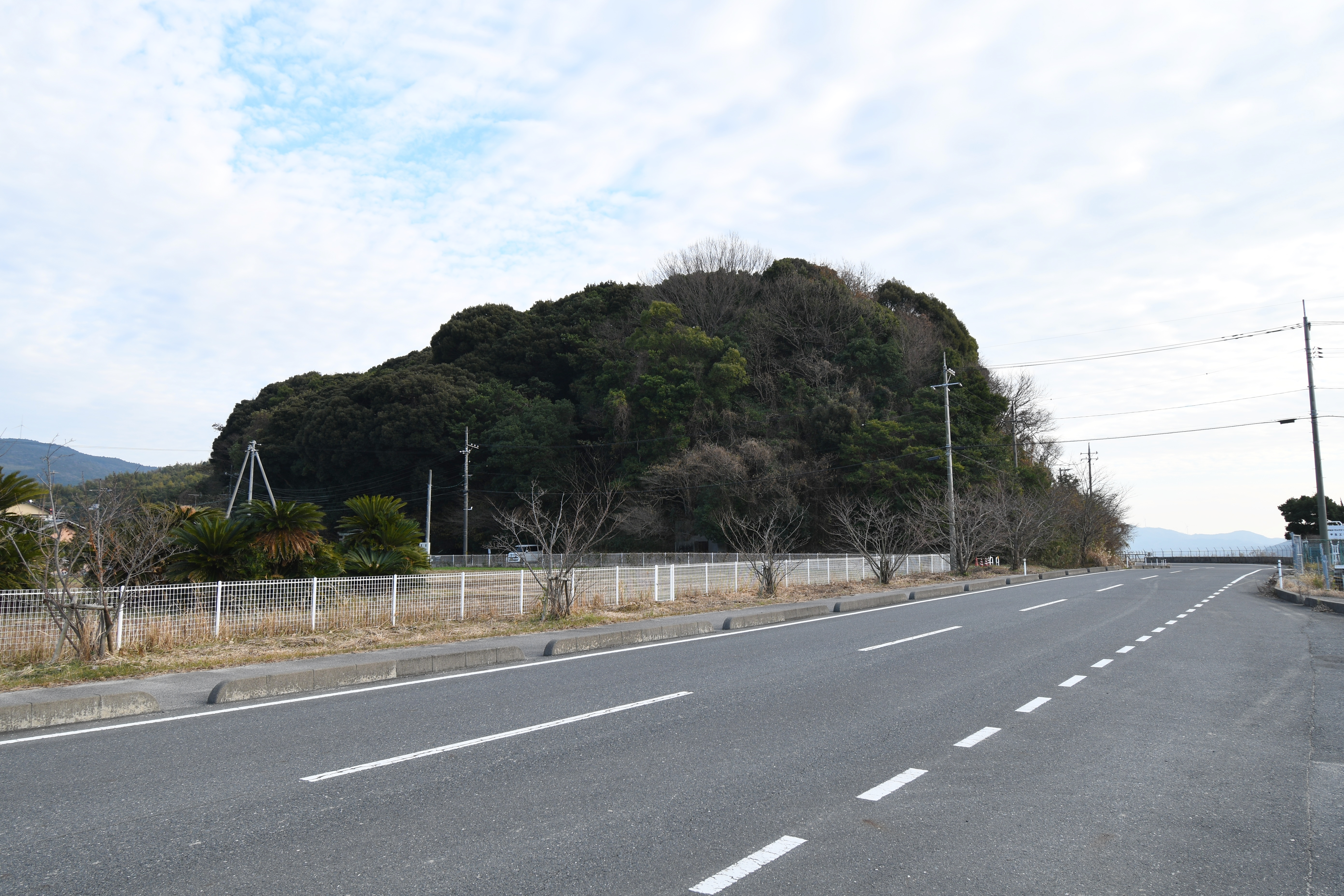
- Jingayama Kofun

- Jingayama Kofun Jingayama Kofun (Japan)
- Interactive map of Jingayama Kofun
- 33°54′38.23″N 132°03′31.2″E
- Type: Kofun
- Periods: Kofun period
- Location: Saga Tanaochi, Hirao, Yamaguchi, Japan
- Region: Chugoku region

History
- Built: early 5th century

Site notes
- Public access: yes
- Yamaguchi Prefecture Historic Site

The Jingayama Kofun (神花山古墳) is a Kofun period burial mound, located in the Saga neighborhood of the town of Hirao, Yamaguchi Prefecture in the Chugoku region of western Japan. The tumulus was designated a Yamaguchi Prefecture Historic Site in 1982.

== Overview ==
The Jingayama Kofun is a zenpō-kōen-fun (前方後円墳), which is shaped like a keyhole, having one square end and one circular end, when viewed from above. It is located on the summit of Jingayama (elevation 39 meters), an isolated hill facing Hirao Bay at the base of the Kumage Peninsula in southeastern Yamaguchi Prefecture. A stone sarcophagus was discovered in 1944 during the construction of an anti-aircraft gun position by the Imperial Japanese Navy during Would War II, and human remains were unearthed. An archaeological excavation was conducted in 1988.

The tumulus is orientated to the east. On the outer surface, fragments of haniwa (cylindrical haniwa and morning glory-shaped haniwa) and fukiishi revetment stones are visible. The burial facility is a box-shaped stone coffin made of thin stone slabs, measuring 1.75 meters long, 0.37 meters wide, and 0.35 meters deep, perpendicular to the main axis of the mound. The human remains that were unearthed from the coffin during wartime were moved to New Zealand by the occupying forces after the surrender of Japan, and only the skull was returned. Subsequent investigations by Nagasaki University identified the remains as those of a woman in her twenties (though it was assumed to be a middle-aged male at the time of discovery). Red pigment was also found inside the coffin, along with fragments of a bronze mirror and a magatama.

The construction period is estimated to be the first half of the 5th century, during the middle of the Kofun period. The Kumage region is also known for the construction of other burial mounds such as the Shiratori Kofun (the largest burial mound in Yamaguchi Prefecture), the Yanai Chausuyama Kofun, and the Atada Kofun, which are considered to form a lineage of chieftain tombs. It is also considered important as an example of the discovery of female human remains.

The burial mound area was designated a Yamaguchi Prefecture Historic Site in 1982. It is currently open to the public after being restored as a historical site. A facial reconstruction of the excavated human remains is displayed at the Hirao Town Historical and Folk Museum, and a statue of the queen based on it has been erected at the site.

Total length
30.3 meters:
Anterior rectangular portion
9.6 meters wide
Posterior circular portion
16.6 meters diameter x 2.6 meters high

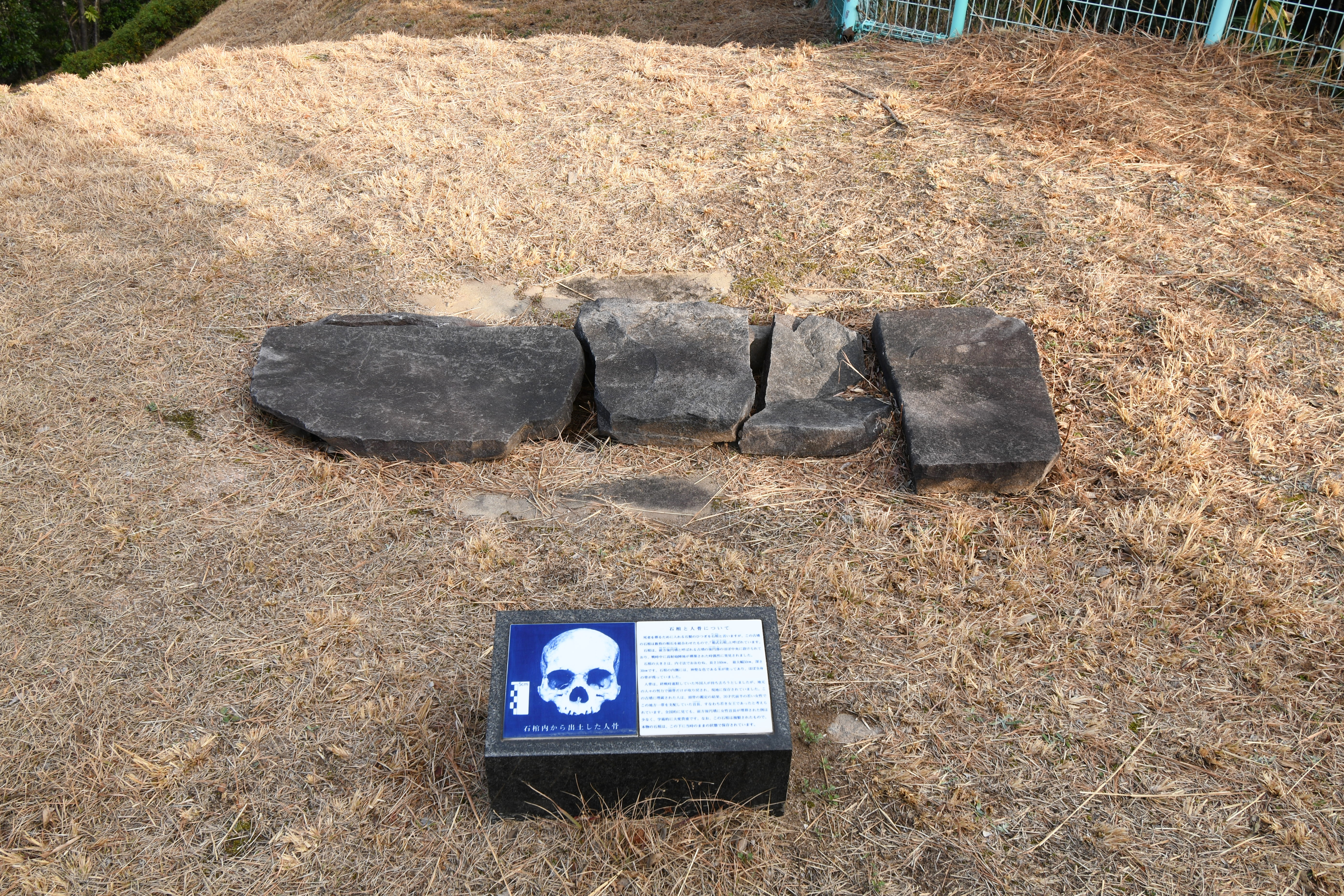
Box-type stone sarcophagus (replica)

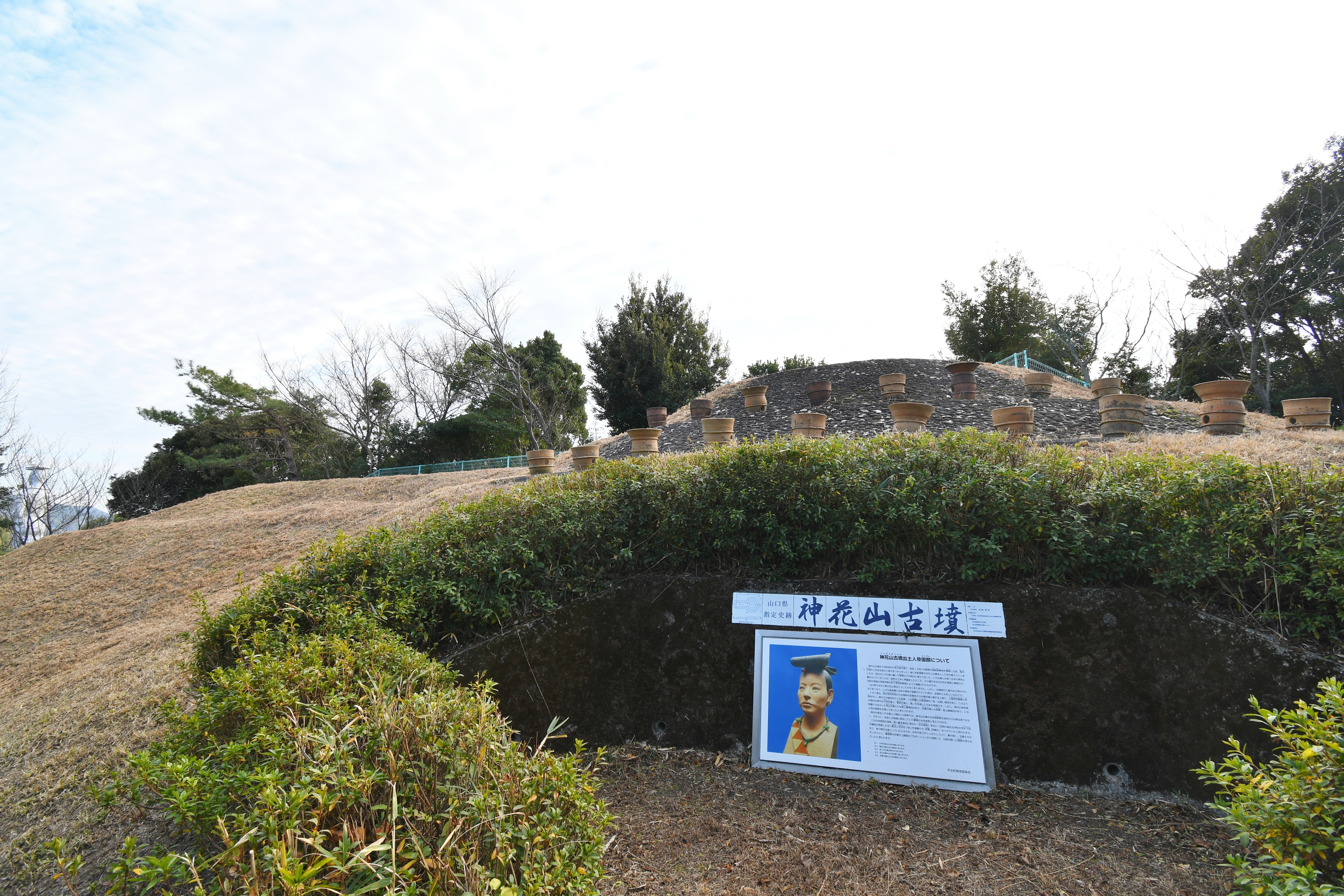
Tumulus (rear circular section on the right, front section in the background on the left)

The tumulus is approximately ten kilometers southwest of Yanai Station on the JR West San'yō Main Line.

== See also ==
- List of Historic Sites of Japan (Yamaguchi)
