= Jinbayama Kofun =

- 仁馬山古墳 (Japanese)
- Jinbayama Kofun Jinbayama Kofun (Japan)
- Interactive map of Jinbayama Kofun
- 34°0′49.87″N 130°56′31.93″E
- Type: Kofun
- Periods: Kofun period
- Location: Shimonoseki, Yamaguchi, Japan
- Region: San'yō region

History
- Built: c.4th century

Site notes
- Public access: Yes (no facilities)

Jinbayama Kofun (仁馬山古墳) is a Kofun period keyhole-shaped burial mound, located in the Nobuyuki neighborhood of the city of Shimonoseki, Yamaguchi in the San'yō region of Japan. The tumulus was designated a National Historic Site of Japan in 1991. It is the largest burial mound in the Nagato region (western Yamaguchi Prefecture) and the third largest in Yamaguchi Prefecture, and is estimated to have been built in the latter half of the 4th century (the first half of the Kofun period).

== Overview ==
The Jinbayama Kofun is located on the eastern edge of a plateau near the mouth of the Ayaragi Plain in the westernmost part of Yamaguchi Prefecture. It is a zenpō-kōen-fun (前方後円墳), which is shaped like a keyhole, having one square end and one circular end, when viewed from above. It was discovered in 1902 and was reported at the time to be a "gourd-shaped" tumulus, as the anterior portion of the mound is relatively undeveloped. Only the posterior circular portion was constructed in three stages, with a diameter of 47 meters and height of eight meters. The anterior portion has a width of 26 meters. From fragments of haniwa is presumed to have had rows of cylindrical haniwa on each stage; however, fukiishi have not been found. The total length of the tumulus is approximately 75-meters and it is orientated to the west-northwest. According to the archaeological excavation conducted from 2005 to 2008, the burial chamber was found to contain a clay sarcophagus encasing a wooden split bamboo-shaped coffin. The coffin is unusually long, measuring about one meter in diameter by 6.2 meters in length. As the burial chamber was intact, it is believed to contain contemporary grave goods in good preservation, but the excavation concluded before the sarcophagus could be opened.

In addition, two small round enpun (円墳)-style kofun (Jinbayama north tumulus and Jinbayama south tumulus), which are thought to be baizuka associated mounds, have been identified at the southern edge of the main tumulus.

At present, the trees around the tumulus have been cut down, and it can be seen from the plains to the south. The tumulus is about 30 minutes on foot from Kajikuri-Gōdaichi Station on the JR West San'in Main Line.

== See also ==
- List of Historic Sites of Japan (Yamaguchi)
