= Suenosue Kiln ruins =

Suenosue Kiln Site
- 陶陶窯跡 (Japanese)
- Suenosue Kiln Site Suenosue Kiln ruins (Japan)
- Interactive map of Suenosue Kiln Site
- 34°05′57″N 131°25′14″E
- Periods: Nara period
- Location: Yamaguchi (city), Japan
- Region: San'yō region

Site notes
- Discovered: 1936
- Public access: Yes (no public facilities)

The Suenosue Kiln Site (陶陶窯跡, Suenosue kama ato) is an archaeological site containing a Nara period kiln located in the Sue neighborhood of the city of Yamaguchi, Yamaguchi Prefecture in the San'yō region of Japan. The site was designated a National Historic Site of Japan in 1948.

== Overview ==
The Suenosue kiln site is located on a southern slope of a hill and is believed to date from the 6th century. As can be inferred from the name of the place where it is located, the entire area has long been known as the site of a Sue ware factory from ancient times. The ruins of a pottery kiln were discovered in 1936, and many pieces of Sue ware were excavated from inside. The kiln was about nine meters long (of which about 2.8 meters survive), and about 1.2 meters wide at the back wall, and about one meter in height. The lower firing port is buried, but the ceiling near the back wall remains, and there is also a smoke vent, so the structure of the semi-underground climbing kiln is preserved. It is thought that the reason why many Sue wares were produced in this area was because there was good quality clay in the vicinity and because the Suō Provincial Capital was nearby. The site is about 15 minutes by car from the Chugoku Expressway Ogori IC.

== See also ==
- List of Historic Sites of Japan (Yamaguchi)
