= Suō Mint =

Japanese coin production facility

- 周防鋳銭司 (Japanese)
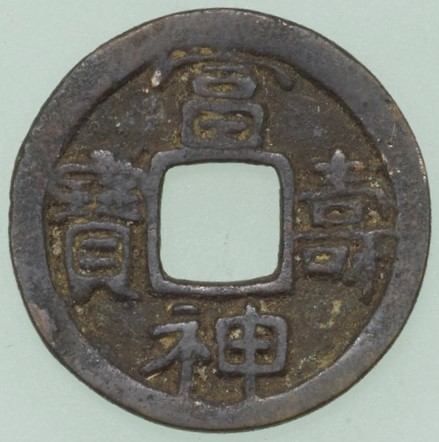
- Fujushinpō minted at the Suō Mint

- Suō Mint ruins Suō Mint (Japan)
- Interactive map of Suō Mint
- 34°05′10″N 131°26′39″E
- Type: Industrial site
- Periods: Heian period
- Location: Yamaguchi, Yamaguchi, Japan
- Region: San'yō region

History
- Built: c.9th century

Site notes
- Public access: Yes (no facilities)

The Suō Mint (周防鋳銭司, Suō no juzenji) was a mint for the production of bronze coins located in the Suzenji neighborhood of the city of Yamaguchi in the San'yō region of Japan. The site was designated a National Historic Site of Japan in 1973.

== History ==
The use of copper coinage was introduced to Japan from the Tang dynasty during the Asuka period, and the first Japanese copper coin was the Wadōkaichin (和同開珎) which were produced from 708. During the Heian period, official government mints were established in Kawachi, Nagato and Suō Province for the production of coinage. The mint located in Suo Province operated for the longest period, and was the only mint in operation from the 820s to around 950 AD. Eight types of coins were produced at this mint, from the Fuju Shinpō (ja:富寿神宝) in 818 to the Kengen Taihō (ja:乾元大宝) in 958. However, the coinage became strongly debased, with its metallic content and value decreasing over time. By the middle of the 9th century, the value of a coin in rice had fallen to 1/150th of its value of the early 8th century. By the end of the 10th century, compounded with weaknesses in the political system, this led to the abandonment of the national currency, with the return to barter trade based on rice as a currency medium.

Full-scale archaeological excavation of the site began in 1966, and was continued from 1971 to 1972. A large amount of bellows, crucibles, pottery, woodware, wooden strips, copper coins, and pieces of old roof tiles were discovered. Currently, only a sign stands at the site, but the artifacts are stored and exhibited at the Susenji Folk Museum. The site is about a 12-minute walk from Yotsutsuji Station on the JR West Sanyo Main Line.

== See also ==
- List of Historic Sites of Japan (Yamaguchi)
