= Yamaguchi Station =

Yamaguchi Station is the name of multiple train stations in Japan.

- Yamaguchi Station (Aichi) in Aichi Prefecture
- Yamaguchi Station (Yamaguchi) in Yamaguchi Prefecture

== See also ==
- Kōhoku Station (Saga), formerly called Yamaguchi Station (until 1913) or Hizen-Yamaguchi Station (until 2022)
