= Otohiko Hara =

Japanese businessman

- 原 乙彦
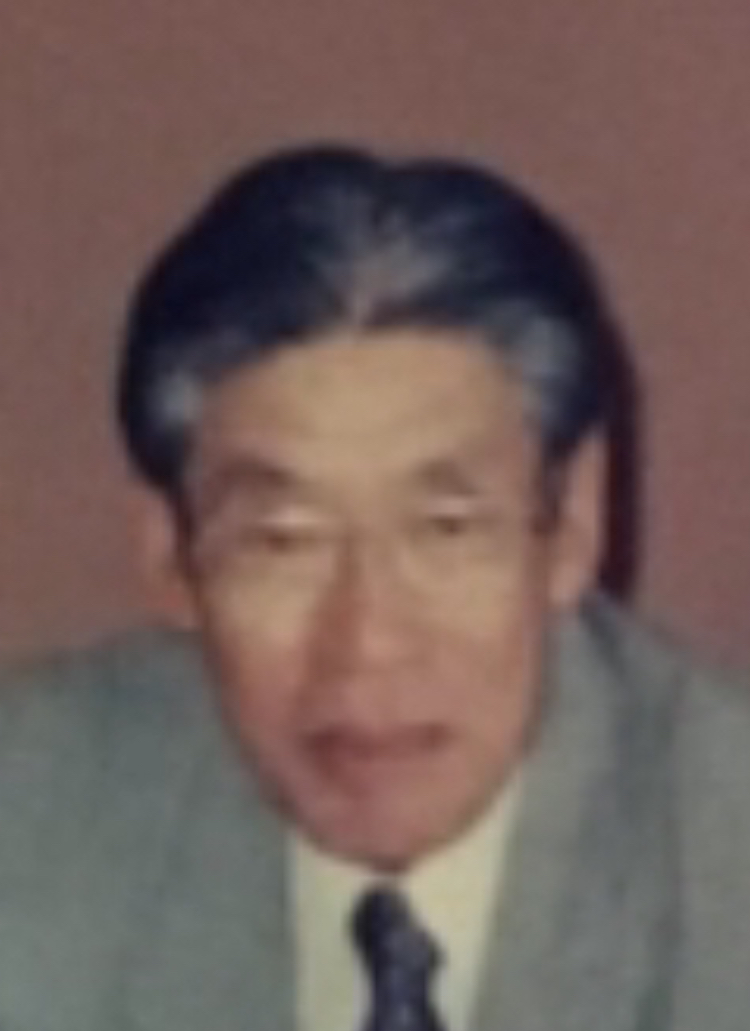
- Born: January 1, 1925; Akasaka, Japan
- Died: April 9, 2018 (aged 93); Kobe, Japan
- Education: Bachelor of Commerce
- Alma mater: Kwansei Gakuin University
- Occupation: president of Unitika Tsusho [:ja:]
- Children: Hideroku Hara
- Relatives: Saburobe Nakai III (relative); Saburobe Nakai IV (relative)

Otohiko Hara (原乙彦, Hara Otohiko; January 1, 1925 – April 9, 2018), formerly known as Otohiko Yabashi, was a Japanese corporate executive. He was a chief executive officer of Unitika Tsusho [:ja:] (later, Unitika Trading [:ja:]). One of the first Japanese businesspersons who led Dai Nippon Spinning Co., Ltd. (later, Unitika), one of Japan's three largest textile makers, to the first overseas expansion of Japanese corporations after World War II.

== Early life ==
Otohiko Hara was born in Akasaka-juku (Nakasendō), Ōgaki as the third son of Jiro Yabashi and Kinu Yabashi, a distinguished family that Emperor Shōwa in 1946 and Emperor Heisei in 1965 when he was crown prince officially visited. Jiro Yabashi was Audit & Supervisory board member of Juroku Bank whose branch located in Akasaka was "Kosan Kaisha" founded by this Yabashi family in 1888 and also run by the same family, renamed "Akasaka Bank" in 1902 and transferred to Juroku Bank in 1942 according to the national recommendations and Kinu Yabashi (née, Yasui) is the elder sister of Kizo Yasui.

Otohiko Hara graduated from Ōgaki Junior High School. He entered the preparatory course of Kwansei Gakuin University. In 1948 he graduated from Kwansei Gakuin University. While in the University, he joined the seminar of professor Rintaro Aoki, leading figure of Japan Accounting Association.

== World War II ==
Under the conscription system for university-students during World War II called Gakuto shutsujin (学徒出陣), Otohiko Hara joined the Imperial Japanese Navy, following Vice-Admiral Minoru Tayui, who was said to have a "Head like a Hammer", and was also from Akasaka-juku, in Gifu prefecture, and graduated from the Naval Academy summa cum laude. During the War Otohiko Hara was in Manchuria and the war ended while he was a lieutenant.

== After World War II ==
Due to the long-term relationship with the Koderas, family of Karō of Finance at Ōgaki Domain since before Meiji Restoration, especially Seizo Kodera, head of the Koderas who later became Audit & Supervisory board member of Amagasaki Spinners (later, Dai Nippon Spinning, Nichibo, Unitika), Yoshikazu Kodera, professor at Kwansei Gakuin University, known for his house designed in a Spanish style by William Merrell Vories, and Gengo Kodera, former president of Dai Nippon Spinning, he came to marry Yuhiko Hara and became the adopted child of 8th Jin-no-jo Hara by changing his family name, who was also involved in the management of cotton spinning company like Seizo and Gengo Kodera for a long time.

== First overseas expansion ==
After the special procurement boom in Japan brought by Korean War coming after World War II, Otohiko Hara was appointed overseas representative of Dai Nippon Spinning (later, Unitika). Then it was the age of Propeller (aeronautics). He had to fly to Brazil by making international connections in many cities at that time and to start from scratch, residing in São Paulo with his wife, Yuhiko Hara, and his son, Hideroku Hara, to lay the foundation for Dai Nippon Spinning's (later, Unitika) starting up activities overseas ahead of other Japanese corporations, for instance, by joining Club Athletico Paulistano, the oldest sports and social club in Brazil, for building up a network of connections. In 1958 Nichibo Brazil was established as the first overseas expansion of Japanese corporations after World War II with the financial support of The Sumitomo Bank when Kichihei Hara, who promoted volleyball actively at Nichibo Kaizuka factory (See 258 consecutive wins of Nichibo Kaizuka [:ja:]), which influenced the sports policy of Kaizuka City, and was later awarded the Grand Cordon of the Order of the Sacred Treasure in June 1975 for long-term distinguished service was the president of Dai Nippon Spinning then.

== Visit of Oriental Witches ==
In 1960 when Otohiko Hara resided in Brazil, All-Japan Women's Volleyball National Team whose members were mostly Dai Nippon Spinning volleyball team players doing clerical work at Dai Nippon Spinning from 8 a.m. to 4 pm, called Oriental Witches led by Hirofumi Daimatsu who was also working for Dai Nippon Spinning Co., Ltd. then after graduating from Kwansei Gakuin University, became politician later, and still remains in the people's minds as "Demon Daimatsu", participated in FIVB Volleyball Women's World Championship held in Brazil, visited Otohiko Hara and encouraged each other. Then Japan won second place. The first place was Soviet Union.

== As a businessperson ==
In 1964 when the above-mentioned Oriental Witches won gold medal in Tokyo Olympics, Dai Nippon Spinning changed its name to Nichibo. On October 1, 1969, Nichibo and Nippon Rayon merged and Unitika Co., Ltd. was formed. In 1973 Otohiko Hara moved to Unitika Tsusho [:ja:] (later, Unitika Trading [:ja:]), was assigned to be senior managing director and subsequently took office as the president of Unitika Tsusho [:ja:] (later, Unitika Trading [:ja:]), concurrently serving as auditor of Osaka Senko Co., Ltd. After he resigned his position, he became full-time auditor of the Osaka Senko and advisor of Unitika Tsusho.

== Later life and death ==
He died on April 9, 2018.

== Kinship ==
- grandfather – Keikichi Yabashi (born in Akasaka-juku (Nakasendō), Landed property owner, director of Akasaka Bank〈later Juroku Bank〉)
- grandfather – Kizo Yasui (born in Hikone, Shiga, entrepreneur in Meiji Era, nicknamed Kōshō Chōchō［Commercial College Town Mayor］because he was elected Town Mayor of Hikone Town against his will while he was in Tokyo to negotiate the establishment of Hikone Commercial College〈now, the Faculty of Economics, Shiga University〉and resigned his post of the Town Mayor of Hikone when he saw new-facility construction of Hikone Commercial College)
- father – Jiro Yabashi (born in Akasaka-juku (Nakasendō), Audit & Supervisory board member of Juroku Bank (See also Tom and Jerry#Outside the United States to know Gifu-based Juroku Bank)))
- mother – Kinu Yabashi (formerly Kinu Yasui, born in Hikone, Shiga, sister of Kizo Yasui)
- adoptive father – Jin-no-jo Hara VIII (born in Osaka, Absentee business owner, Landed property owner, director of Ise Shrine Revered Board)
- spouse – Yuhiko Hara (born in Osaka, second daughter of Jin-no-jo Hara VIII)
- uncle – Kizo Yasui (born in Hikone, Shiga, Chairman of Toray Industries, vice-chairman of Nihon Keidanren (Japan Business Federation), 4th chairman of audit committee of Japanese National Railways, general manager of Tokyo Metropolis of Ise Shrine Revered Board)
- relative – Kenkichi Yabashi (born in Akasaka-juku (Nakasendō), architect, bureaucrat of Ministry of Finance, known for the construction of National Diet Building. See List of Japanese architects#Pre Meiji period, Meiji period (1868–1911), Taisho Period (1912–1925), Showa Period (1926–1945) to know him)
- relative – Kazuhide Nakano (the 8th head of the founding family, the Nakano family, of Mizkan. The above-mentioned Kayako Yabashi〈ja〉, spouse of the above-mentioned Ryotaro Yabashi〈ja〉, is his sister. He used to call himself Matazaemon Nakano VIII.)
- relative – Saburobe Nakai III (the founder of Japan Pulp and Paper Company. Hiroko Hara, younger sister of Otohiko Hara's wife, married to the Nakai family, whose ancestors are Saburobe Nakai III and Saburobe Nakai IV)
- relative – Saburobe Nakai IV (the president of "Echisan Shoten" (later, "Nakai Shoten", thereafter Japan Pulp and Paper Company. Hiroko Hara, younger sister of Otohiko Hara's wife, married to the Nakai family, whose ancestors are Saburobe Nakai III and Saburobe Nakai IV)
- distant relative – Ikutaro Tokoro (born in Akasaka-juku (Nakasendō), formerly Ikutaro Yabashi, a doctor practicing Western medicine and also a patriot in the closing days of the Tokugawa shogunate, well known as the doctor who saved the life of Inoue Kaoru severely wounded by the attack of the assassins and the staff officer of Takasugi Shinsaku)

== See also ==
- Japan women's national volleyball team
- Volleyball at the 1964 Summer Olympics – Women's tournament
