= Hara (surname) =

Hara (written 原 or はら) is a Japanese surname. Notable people with the surname include:

- Hara Masatane (原 昌胤, 1531–1575), senior retainer of the Takeda clan during the late Sengoku period
- Hara Nagayori (原 長頼, 1544–1600), Japanese samurai of the Sengoku through late Azuchi-Momoyama period
- Hara Takashi (原 敬, 1856–1921), the 19th Prime Minister of Japan
- Hara Toratane (原 虎胤, 1497–1564), Japanese general under Takeda Shingen
- Otohiko Hara (原 乙彦, 1925–2018), Japanese businessman
- Arthur S. Hara, prominent Japanese-Canadian businessman and philanthropist
- Atsushi Hara (原 篤志, born 1979), Japanese professional radio-controlled car racer
- Aya Hara (原 亜弥), Japanese voice actress
- Ayako Hara (原 綾子; born 1988), Japanese model and beauty pageant winner
- Burt Hara, the principal clarinetist with the Minnesota Orchestra
- Chieko Hara (原 千恵子; 1914–2001), Japanese pianist
- Chisako Hara (原 知佐子, 1936–2020), Japanese actress
- Chūichi Hara (原 忠一, 1889–1964), admiral in the Imperial Japanese Navy during World War II
- Daigo Hara (原 大虎; born 1974), Japanese freestyle skier
- Erika Hara (原 英莉花; born 1999), Japanese professional golfer
- Eriko Hara (原 えりこ), Japanese voice actress
- Ernest Hideo Hara (1909–2006), Hawaiian architect of Japanese descent
- Fumina Hara (原 史奈, born 1981), Japanese actress and idol
- George Hara Williams (1894–1945), American farmer activist and politician
- Hidenori Hara (原 秀則, born 1961), Japanese manga artist
- Hideroku Hara (原 秀六, born 1956), Japanese legal scholar
- Hiromi Hara (原 博実, born 1958), Japanese ex-soccer player and former manager of F.C. Tokyo
- Hiroshi Hara (disambiguation)
- Kanesuke Hara (原 摂祐, botany abbreviation Hara, 1885–1962), Japanese botanist and mycologist
- Kazuki Hara (原 一樹, born 1985), Japanese football player
- Kazuko Hara (原 嘉壽子, born 1935), prolific Japanese opera composer
- Kazuo Hara (原 一男), Japanese documentary film director
- Keiichi Hara (原 恵一, born 1959), Japanese director of animated films
- Kenya Hara (born 1958), Japanese graphic designer and curator
- Kenzaburo Hara (disambiguation)
- Komako Hara (1910–1968), Japanese actress
- Martinho Hara (マルティノ 原, 1569–1629), Japanese nobleman of Tenshō embassy who was one of the first official Japanese emissaries to Europe.
- Masafumi Hara (born 1943), retired Japanese football player
- Mikie Hara (原 幹恵, born 1987), Japanese gravure idol and actress
- Mikiko Hara (原 美樹子, born 1967), Japanese photographer
- Naohisa Hara (原 直久, born 1946), Japanese photographer
- Nobuki Hara (born 1979), former Japanese football player
- Nobuo Hara (原 信夫, 1926–2021), Japanese saxophonist
- Ryuta Hara (原 竜太, born 1981), retired Japanese football player
- Sachie Hara (原 沙知絵, born 1978), Japanese actress and model
- Saori Hara (原 紗央莉, born 1988), Japanese adult video idol, model and actress
- Setsuko Hara (原 節子, 1920–2015), Japanese actress
- Susumu Hara (原 進, 1947–2015), Japanese wrestler who is better known as Ashura Hara
- Taira Hara (はら たいら, 1943–2006), Japanese manga artist
- Tameichi Hara (原 為一, 1900–1980), Imperial Japanese naval commander during the Pacific War
- Tamiki Hara (原 民喜, 1905–1951), Japanese author and survivor of the bombing of Hiroshima
- Tatsunori Hara (原 辰徳, born 1958), the current manager for the Yomiuri Giants baseball team in Nippon Professional Baseball
- Teruki Hara (原 輝綺; born 1998), Japanese footballer
- Tetsuo Hara (原 哲夫, born 1961), Japanese manga artist
- Yasuyoshi Hara (原 康義, born 1952), Japanese actor and voice actor
- Yoshimichi Hara (原 嘉道, 1867–1944, Japanese representative of Emperor Hirohito during World War II
- Yuko Hara (原 由子) (born 1956), keyboard player for Southern All Stars
- Yumi Hara (born 1985) Japanese voice actress
- Yumiko Hara (原 裕美子, born 1982), Japanese marathon runner
- Yutaka Hara (原 ゆたか), Japanese manga artist
- Yutaro Hara (原 裕太郎, born 1990), Japanese football player

== Fictional characters ==
- Sumire Hara (原 寿美鈴), a character in the Assassination Classroom anime and manga
- Masako Hara (原 真砂子), a character from anime and manga Ghost Hunt

== Finnish surname ==
- Marika Hara, Finnish mountain bike orienteering competitor and world champion
