= Kizo Yasui =

Japanese corporate executive

Kizo Yasui 安居 喜造
- Born: December 2, 1899; Hikone, Japan
- Died: September 30, 1983 (aged 83); Tokyo, Japan
- Education: Bachelor of Commerce
- Alma mater: Hitotsubashi University
- Occupations: • Vice-president of Mitsui Bank • president of Mitsui Petrochemicals Industries (now, Mitsui Chemicals) • Chair of the board of directors of Toray Industries • vice-chairman of Nihon Keidanren (Japan Business Federation) • the 4th chair of audit committee of Japanese National Railways • general manager of Tokyo Metropolis of Ise Shrine Revered Board

Kizo Yasui (安居 喜造, Yasui Kizō; December 2, 1899 – September 30, 1983) was a Japanese corporate executive. He held the positions of the chairman of the board of directors of Toray Industries, vice-president of Mitsui Bank, president of Mitsui Petrochemicals Industries, vice-chairman of Nihon Keidanren (Japan Business Federation), chairman of Japan Chemical Fibers Association and others. He was also general manager of Tokyo Metropolis of Ise Shrine Revered Board. He dedicated himself to reconstructing Japanese National Railways as the 4th chairman of audit committee thereof. He received Grand Cordon of the Order of the Sacred Treasure in 1979.

== Biography ==
Yasui was born in Hikone, Shiga. He carried on his father's name, Kizo. The last Kizo Yasui, father of this Kizo Yasui, was nicknamed Kōshō Chōchō［Commercial College Town Mayor］because he was elected Town Mayor of Hikone Town against his will while he was in Tokyo to negotiate the establishment of Hikone Commercial College（now, the Faculty of Economics of Shiga University）and resigned his post of the Town Mayor of Hikone when he saw new-facility construction of Hikone Commercial College. His older sister, Kinu, married into a distinguished family in Akasaka-juku (Nakasendō), the Yabashis that Emperor Shōwa officially visited in 1946. Otohiko Hara (jp), formerly Otohiko Yabashi, is his nephew. Shinya Yabashi and Hideroku Hara (jp) are his grandnephews. Yasui graduated from Shiga First Junior High School (now, Shiga Prefectural Hikone Higashi High School) and from Tokyo College of Commerce (now, Hitotsubashi University) in 1926 under the old system of education. While in the College, he joined the seminar of Prof. Kin-no-suke Otsuka.

He entered Mitsui Bank after graduation. He became managing director, senior managing director and vice-president of Mitsui Bank in 1959, president of Mitsui Petrochemicals Industries (now, Mitsui Chemicals) in 1961, vice-president of Tōyō Rayon (now, Toray Industries) in 1963, chairman of the board of directors of Toray Industries in 1971 and senior advisor to the board of directors of Toray Industries in 1977.

During this period, he successively held the positions of vice-chairman of Nihon Keidanren (Japan Business Federation), chairman of Japan Chemical Fibers Association, general manager of Tokyo Metropolis of Ise Shrine Revered Board, member of the board of Japan Association of Corporate Executives, member of Tax Research Committee of Prime Minister's Office (Japan), member of National Language Council of Ministry of Education, Science and Culture and so on.

He received Grand Cordon of the Order of the Sacred Treasure in 1979.

He died in 1983 at the age of 83 of pneumonia. The chairman of the funeral ceremony of Kizo Yasui was Fumio Takagi（jp）, former Vice Minister of Ministry of Finance and former president of Japanese National Railways.

== Kinship ==
- father – Kizo Yasui (entrepreneur from Hikone, Shiga in Meiji Era. He was nicknamed Kōshō Chōchō（Commercial College Town Mayor） because he was elected Town Mayor of Hikone Town against his will while he was in Tokyo to negotiate the establishment of Hikone Commercial College（now, the Faculty of Economics, Shiga University）and resigned his post of the Town Mayor of Hikone when he saw new-facility construction of Hikone Commercial College.)
- sister – Kinu Yabashi (née Yasui, married Jiro Yabashi, Audit & Supervisory board member of Juroku Bank (See also Tom and Jerry#Outside the United States to know Gifu-based Juroku Bank))
- nephew – Otohiko Hara (jp) (Formerly Otohiko Yabashi. Former Chief executive officer of Unitika Trading. One of the first Japanese businesspersons who lead Nichibo (Unitika) to the first overseas expansion of Japanese corporations after World War II)
- grandnephew – Shinya Yabashi (President of Yabashi Industries, Chairman of Ogaki Municipal Board of Education)
- grandnephew – Hideroku Hara (jp) (Legal Scholar, Professor at Shiga University)
