= Otohiko =

- Gender: Male

Origin
- Origin: Japanese
- Meaning: Different meanings depending on the kanji used

Otohiko (written: 乙彦) is a masculine Japanese given name. Notable people with the name include:

- Otohiko Endō (遠藤 乙彦; born 1947), Japanese politician
- Otohiko Ichiki (市来 乙彦; 1872–1954), Japanese businessman and banker
- Otohiko Hara (原 乙彦; 1925–2018), Japanese businessman
- Otohiko Kaga (加賀 乙彦; born 1929), Japanese writer
- Otohiko Kiyono (清野 乙彦; born 1973), Japanese footballer
