= Akasaka-juku =

Akasaka-juku (赤坂宿) is the name of two post stations in Japan during the Edo period.

- Akasaka-juku (Tōkaidō), the thirty-sixth station on the Tōkaidō
- Akasaka-juku (Nakasendō), the fifty-sixth station on the Nakasendō
