= Kurowashiki All Japan Volleyball Tournament =

- Sport: Volleyball
- Founded: 1952; 73 years ago
- No. of teams: 16 (men and women)
- Country: Japan
- Most recent champion(s): Men: Wolfdogs Nagoya; Women: PFU BlueCats (2023)
- Official website: https://www.jva.or.jp/

Kurowashiki All Japan Volleyball Tournament (黒鷲旗全日本男女選抜バレーボール大会, Kurowashiki Zen Nippon Danjo Senbatsu Volleyball Taikai), is a volleyball tournament in Japan.

Kurowashiki (Japanese: 黒鷲旗) means the flag of black eagle. It opens in May every year in Osaka. It is organized by the Japan Volleyball Association and the Mainichi Newspapers.

== History ==
- 1952 - It started as All Japan Volleyball Championship.
- 2007 - All Japan Volleyball Championship was renamed as Kurowashiki All Japan Volleyball Tournament.

== Championship records ==
MEN

- 1952 - Yahata Steel
- 1953 - Yahata Steel
- 1954 - Nihon Koukan (NKK)
- 1955 - Nihon Koukan (NKK)
- 1956 - Sumitomo Metal Kokura
- 1957 - Yahata Steel
- 1958 - Sumitomo Metal Kokura
- 1959 - Nihon Koukan (NKK)
- 1960 - Yahata Steel
- 1961 - Toray
- 1962 - Nihon Koukan (NKK)
- 1963 - Toray
- 1964 - Matsushita Denki (Panasonic)
- 1965 - Nihon Koukan (NKK)
- 1966 - Matsushita Denki (Panasonic)
- 1967 - Yahata Steel
- 1968 - Matsushita Denki (Panasonic)
- 1969 - Matsushita Denki (Panasonic)
- 1970 - Nihon Koukan (NKK)
- 1971 - Nihon Koukan (NKK)
- 1972 - Sumitomo Light Metal
- 1973 - Matsushita Denki (Panasonic)
- 1974 - Shin Nihon Steel
- 1975 - Shin Nihon Steel
- 1976 - Shin Nihon Steel
- 1977 - Shin Nihon Steel
- 1978 - Fuji Photo Film
- 1979 - Suntory
- 1980 - Shin Nihon Steel
- 1981 - Matsushita Denki (Panasonic)
- 1982 - Nihon Koukan (NKK)
- 1983 - Fuji Photo Film
- 1984 - Shin Nihon Steel
- 1985 - Suntory
- 1986 - Fuji Photo Film
- 1987 - Fuji Photo Film
- 1988 - Shin Nihon Steel
- 1989 - Shin Nihon Steel
- 1990 - Shin Nihon Steel
- 1991 - Suntory
- 1992 - NEC
- 1993 - NEC
- 1994 - NEC Blue Rockets
- 1995 - Suntory Sunbirds
- 1996 - NEC Blue Rockets
- 1997 - NEC Blue Rockets
- 1998 - Panasonic Panthers
- 1999 - NEC Blue Rockets
- 2000 - Suntory Sunbirds
- 2001 - JT Thunders
- 2002 - Toray Arrows
- 2003 - NEC Blue Rockets
- 2004 - JT Thunders
- 2005 - Toray Arrows
- 2006 - Toray Arrows
- 2007 - NEC Blue Rockets
- 2008 - Panasonic Panthers
- 2009 - Panasonic Panthers
- 2010 - Panasonic Panthers
- 2011 - Toray Arrows
- 2012 - Panasonic Panthers
- 2013 - Suntory Sunbirds
- 2014 - Panasonic Panthers
- 2015 - Suntory Sunbirds
- 2016 - JT Thunders
- 2017 - JT Thunders
- 2018 - Panasonic Panthers
- 2019 - Suntory Sunbirds
- 2020, 2021- Cancelled, due to COVID-19 pandemic in Japan
- 2022 - Suntory Sunbirds
- 2023 - Wolfdogs Nagoya
- 2024 - Suntory Sunbirds

WOMEN

- 1952 - Kurabo Manju
- 1953 - Nichibo Ashikaga
- 1954 - Kanebo Yokkaichi
- 1955 - Kurabo Kurashiki
- 1956 - Nichibo Kaizuka
- 1957 - Nichibo Kaizuka
- 1958 - Nichibo Kaizuka
- 1959 - Nichibo Kaizuka
- 1960 - Kurabo Kurashiki
- 1961 - Nichibo Kaizuka
- 1962 - Nichibo Kaizuka
- 1963 - Nichibo Kaizuka
- 1964 - Nichibo Kaizuka
- 1965 - Nichibo Kaizuka
- 1966 - Nichibo Kaizuka
- 1967 - Nichibo Kaizuka
- 1968 - Hitachi Musashi
- 1969 - Nichibo Kaizuka
- 1970 - Yashica
- 1971 - Unitika Kaizuka
- 1972 - Hitachi Musashi
- 1973 - Hitachi Musashi
- 1974 - Hitachi Musashi
- 1975 - Hitachi
- 1976 - Hitachi
- 1977 - Hitachi
- 1978 - Hitachi
- 1979 - Hitachi
- 1980 - Colorado Springs (United States)
- 1981 - Unitika
- 1982 - Hitachi
- 1983 - Hitachi
- 1984 - Hitachi
- 1985 - Hitachi
- 1986 - Daiei
- 1987 - Hitachi
- 1988 - Hitachi
- 1989 - Unitika
- 1990 - Ito Yokado
- 1991 - Unitika
- 1992 - Daiei
- 1993 - Hitachi
- 1994 - Hitachi Bellefille
- 1995 - Unitika Phoenix
- 1996 - Daiei Orange Attakers
- 1997 - NEC Red Rockets
- 1998 - Daiei Orange Attakers
- 1999 - Orange Attakers
- 2000 - Unitika Phoenix
- 2001 - NEC Red Rockets
- 2002 - Toray Arrows
- 2003 - Pioneer Red Wings
- 2004 - Toray Arrows
- 2005 - Pioneer Red Wings
- 2006 - Hisamitsu Springs
- 2007 - Hisamitsu Springs
- 2008 - Denso Airybees
- 2009 - Toray Arrows
- 2010 - Toray Arrows
- 2011 - JT Marvelous
- 2012 - JT Marvelous
- 2013 - Hisamitsu Springs
- 2014 - Toyota Auto Body Queenseis
- 2015 - JT Marvelous
- 2016 - JT Marvelous
- 2017 - Denso Airybees
- 2018 - JT Marvelous
- 2019 - Toray Arrows
- 2020, 2021 - Cancelled, due to COVID-19 pandemic in Japan
- 2022 - Toray Arrows
- 2023 - PFU BlueCats
- 2024 - Okayama Seagulls
