= Aratakisan Castle =

Castle ruins in Ube, Yamaguchi, Japan

Aritakisan Castle
- 荒滝山城
- Ube, Yamaguchi, Japan
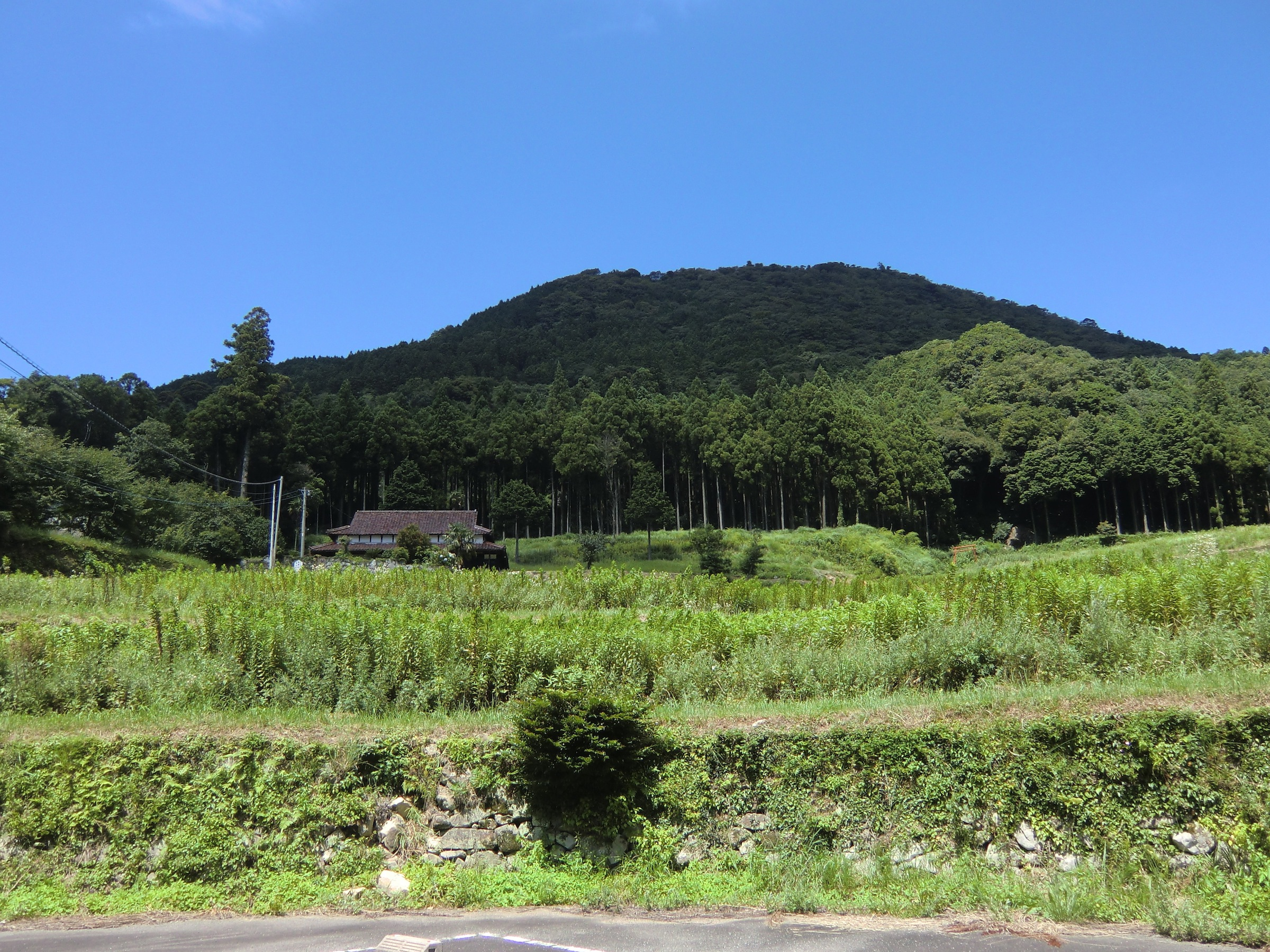
- Aritakisan Castle ruins

Site information
- Type: yamajiro-style Japanese castle
- Controlled by: Naito clan
- Condition: ruins

Location
- Aritakisan Castle Aritakisan Castle (Japan)
- Coordinates: 34°08′58.51″N 131°17′57.5″E

Site history
- Built: c.1532-1555
- Built by: Naito Takaharu
- Demolished: Edo period
- Yamaguchi Prefecture Historic Site

Aritakisan Castle (荒滝山城, Aritakisan-jō) (also known as Aritaki Castle (荒滝城, Aritaki-jō)) was a Sengoku period yamajiro-style Japanese castle located in what is now the city of Ube, Yamaguchi Prefecture, Japan. The ruins have been protected as a Yamaguchi Prefectural Historic Site since 2008.

== Overview ==
Aritakisan Castle was a typical yamajiro fortress built to take advantage of the uneven terrain of a mountain, making it difficult for enemies to attack. Near the summit, there are numerous interconnected enclosures (kuruwa) protected by earthen ramparts and dry moats. Mountain castles were only used during wartime; normally, people lived on the flat land at the foot of the mountain. The castle is located on Located on Mount Arataki, at an elevation of 459 meters, and the remains spread over an area of approximately 700 meters east–west and 200 meters north–south. Centered around the inner bailey at the summit, it consists of three groups of enclosures: an outer bailey (Senjōjiki) built on the eastern ridge and the western bailey on the western ridge. The three baileys were formed by utilizing the steep natural terrain, creating flat areas by leveling the mountaintops and ridges. Each bailey group is separated by double and triple trenches, and stonework is extensively used at key points such as entrances and defensive lines. On the northern slopes of each bailey group, a series of vertical trenches forming a "ridge-like dry moat" is positioned to prevent enemy intrusion. It is one of the largest mountain castles in Yamaguchi Prefecture. The mountaintop offers a strategic location with panoramic views of a wide area, from the Seto Inland Sea to the inland Yoshibe Basin, Mito, and Akiyoshi regions.

The exact date of its construction is unknown, but Edo Period records of Chōshū Domain indicate that it served as the stronghold of Naito Takaharu, a senior retainer of the Ōuchi clan and Mōri clan during the Tenbun era (1532-1555). Archaeological excavations have yielded medieval earthenware (kawarake) characteristic of Ōuchi-related sites, including ceramics imported from Ming China and Korea from the mid-to-late 16th century. It is believed that a residence existed at the foot of the mountain to the north during peacetime. The castle was abandoned during the Edo period, but the mountaintop where the castle once stood was used as a smoke-signal beacon by Chōshū Domain.

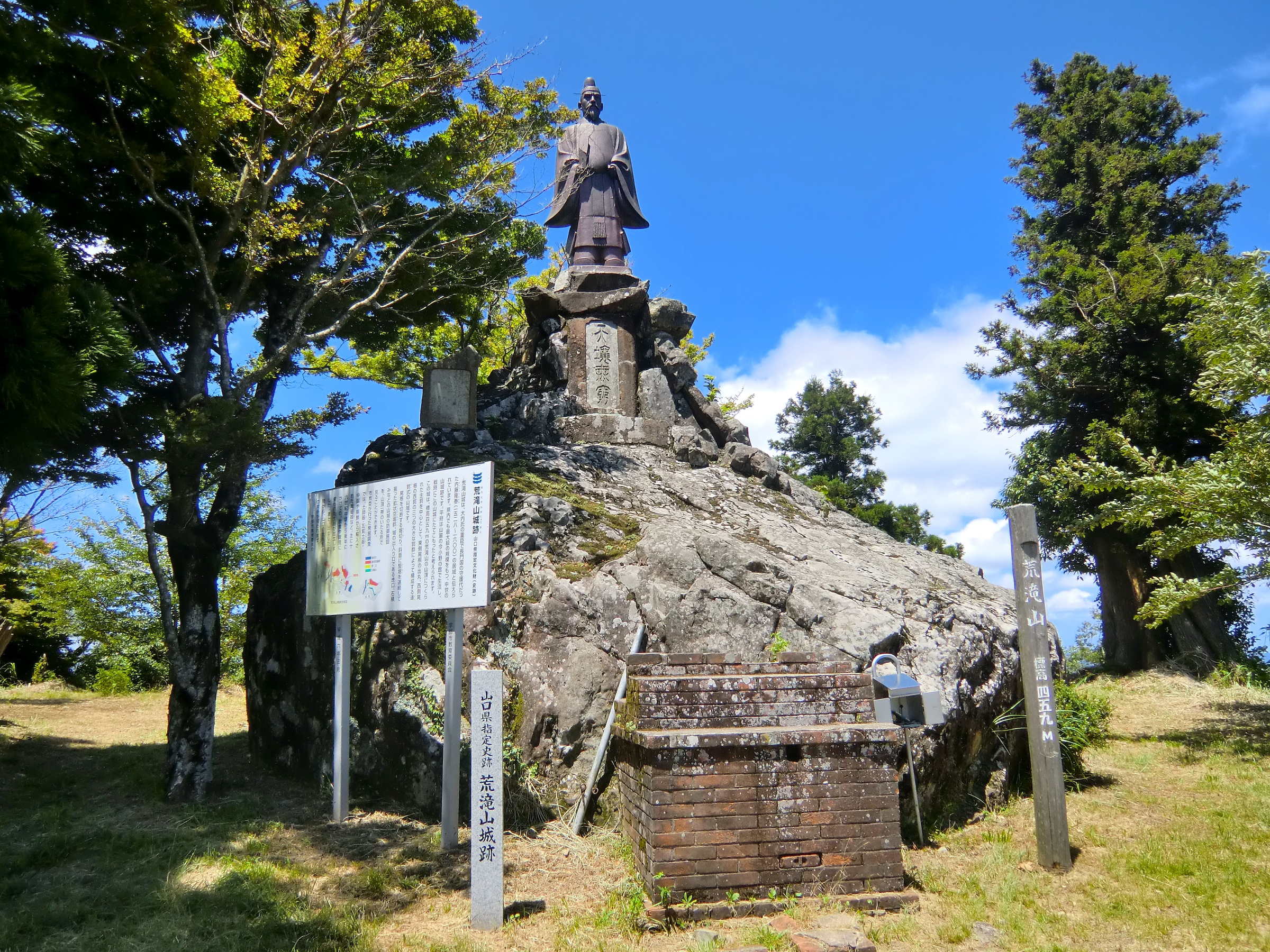
Site of the signal fire station and statue of Emperor Meiji at the mountaintop (main enclosure)

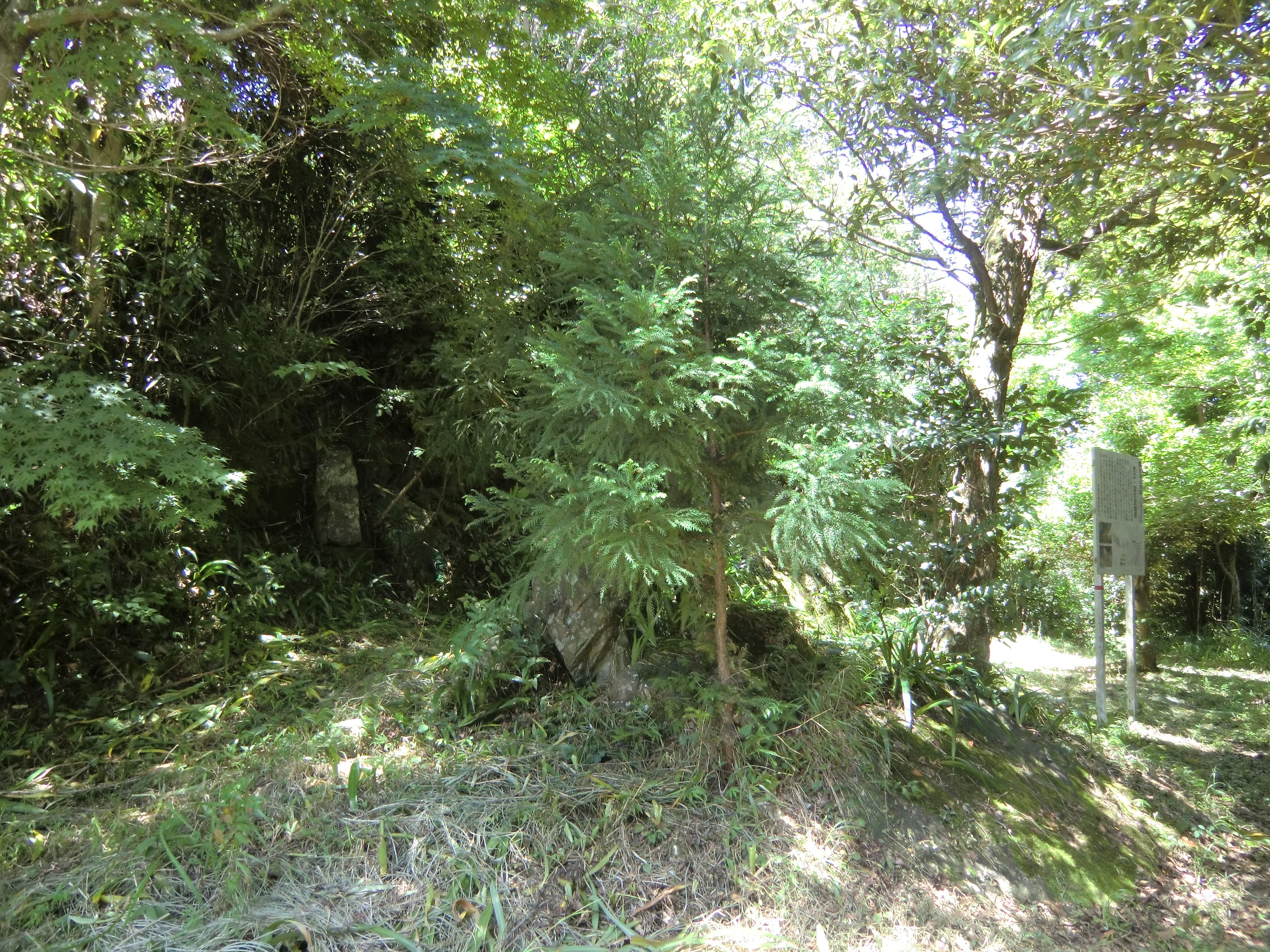
Site of the gate on the east side of the main enclosure. Part of the exposed bedrock has been cut away.

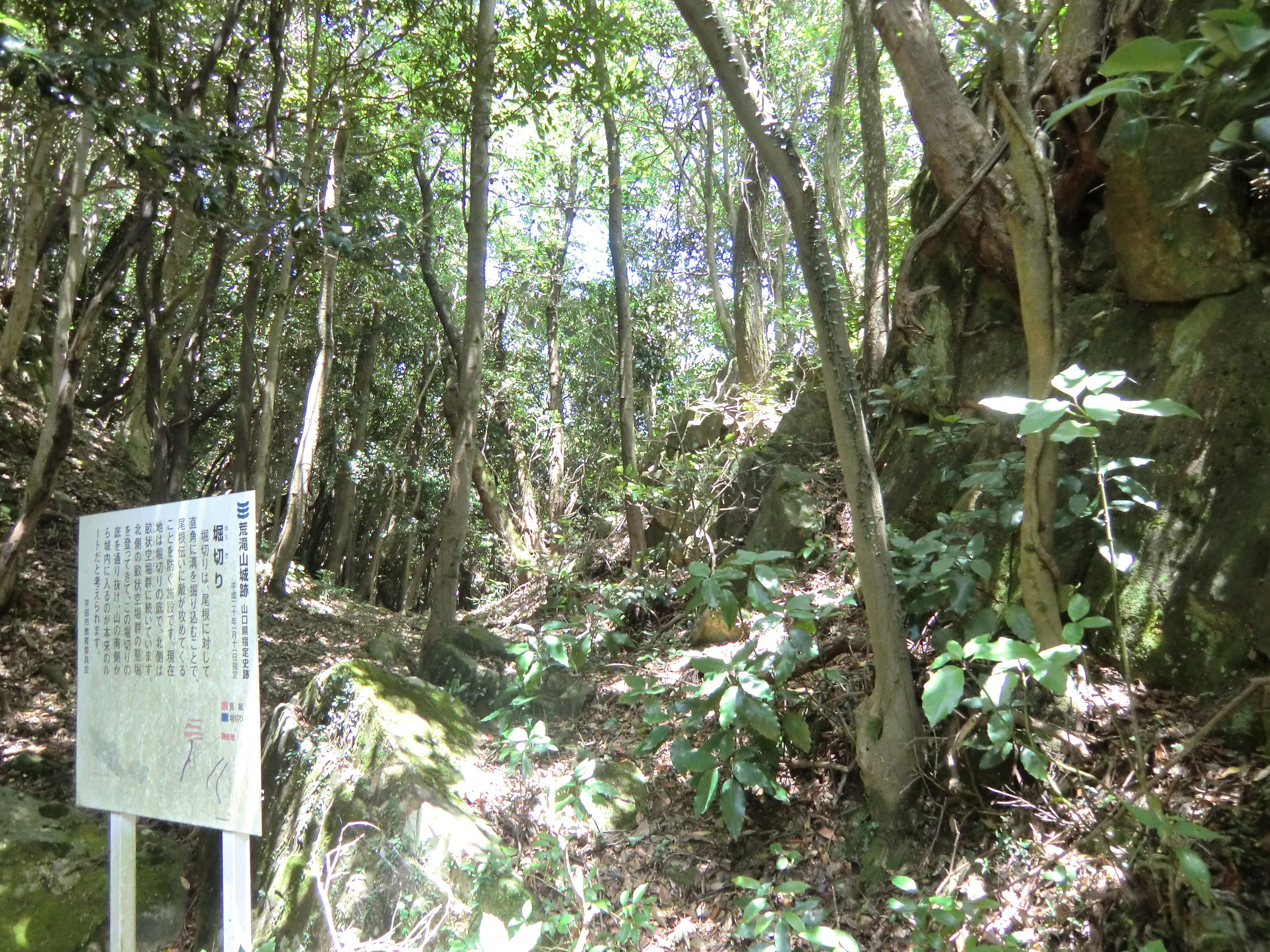
Moat on the east side of the main enclosure (moat on the ridge leading to the outer enclosure)

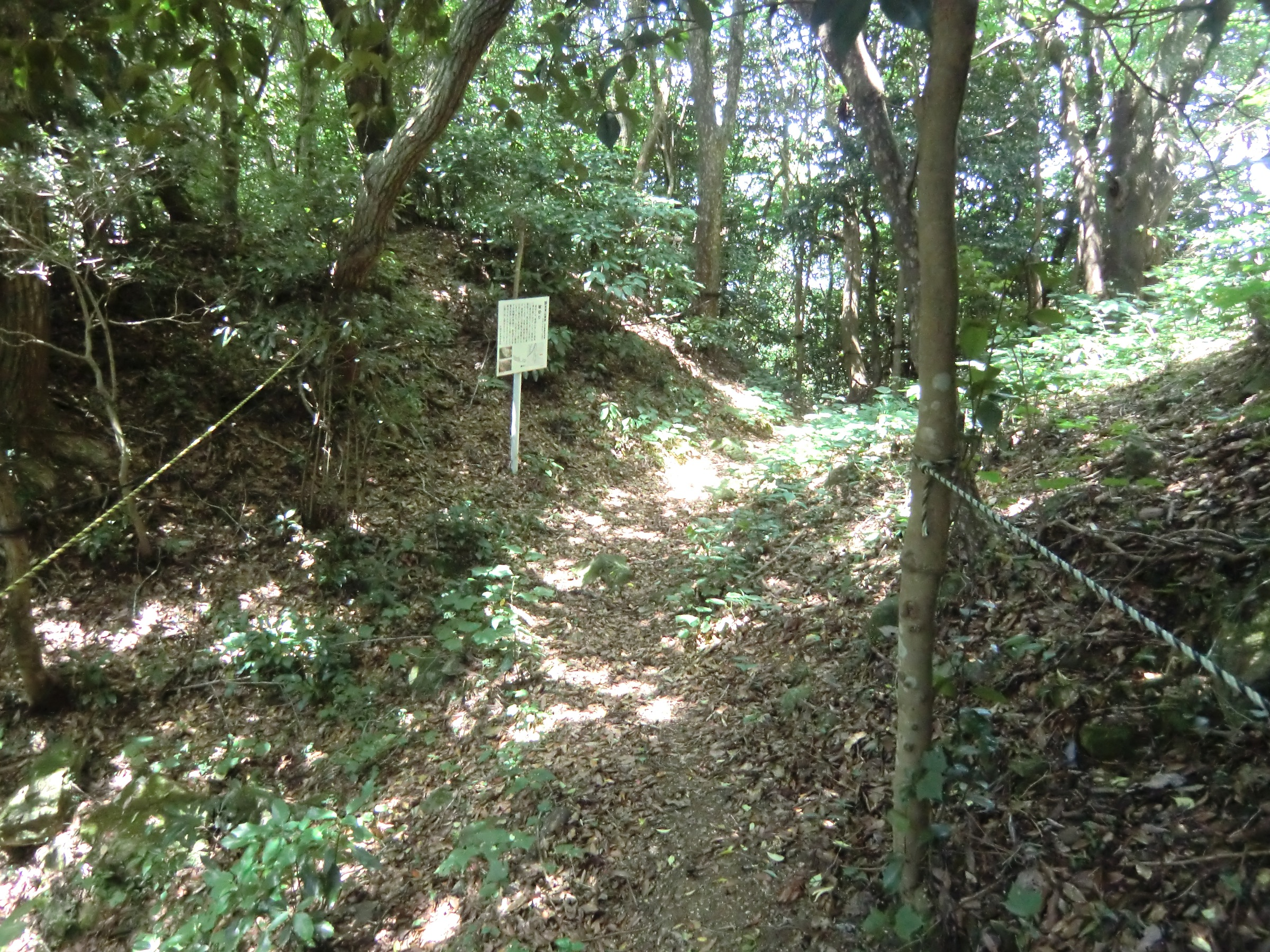
Moat on the west side of the main enclosure (moat on the ridge leading to the west enclosure)

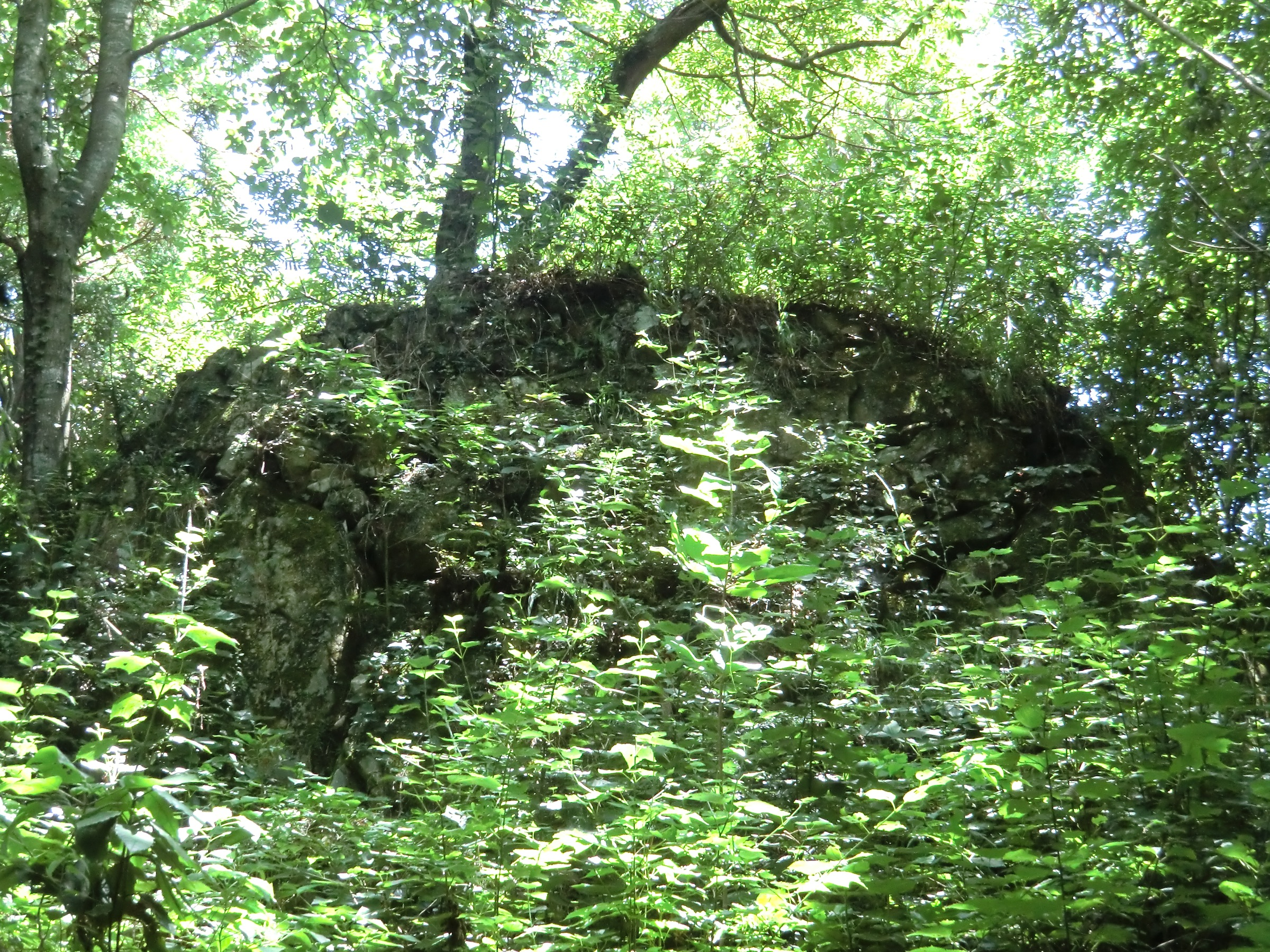
Stone wall of the moat on the west side of the main enclosure

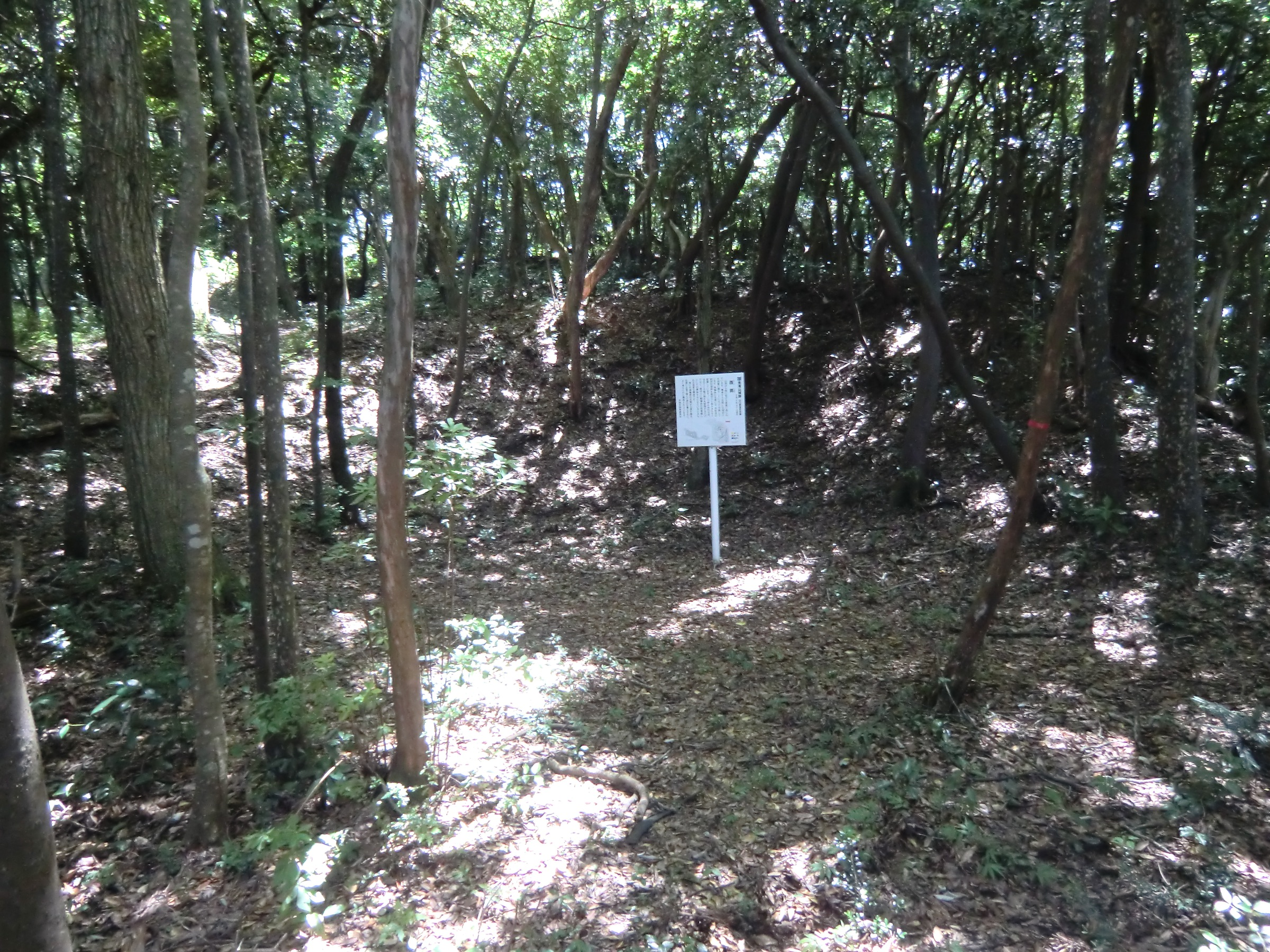
West enclosure

The castle ruins are approximately 22 kilometers northwest from JR West San'yō Main Line Kamigō Station.

== See also ==
- List of Historic Sites of Japan (Yamaguchi)
