= Naohisa =

- Gender: Male

Origin
- Origin: Japanese
- Meaning: Different meanings depending on the kanji used

Naohisa (written: 直久 or 直寿) is a masculine Japanese given name. Notable people with the name include:

- Naohisa Hara (原 直久; born 1946), Japanese photographer
- Naohisa Inoue (井上 直久; born 1948), Japanese painter
- Naohisa Takato (高藤 直寿; born 1993), Japanese judoka
