= Kamigō Station =

Railway station in Yamaguchi, Yamaguchi Prefecture, Japan

Kamigō Station 上郷駅
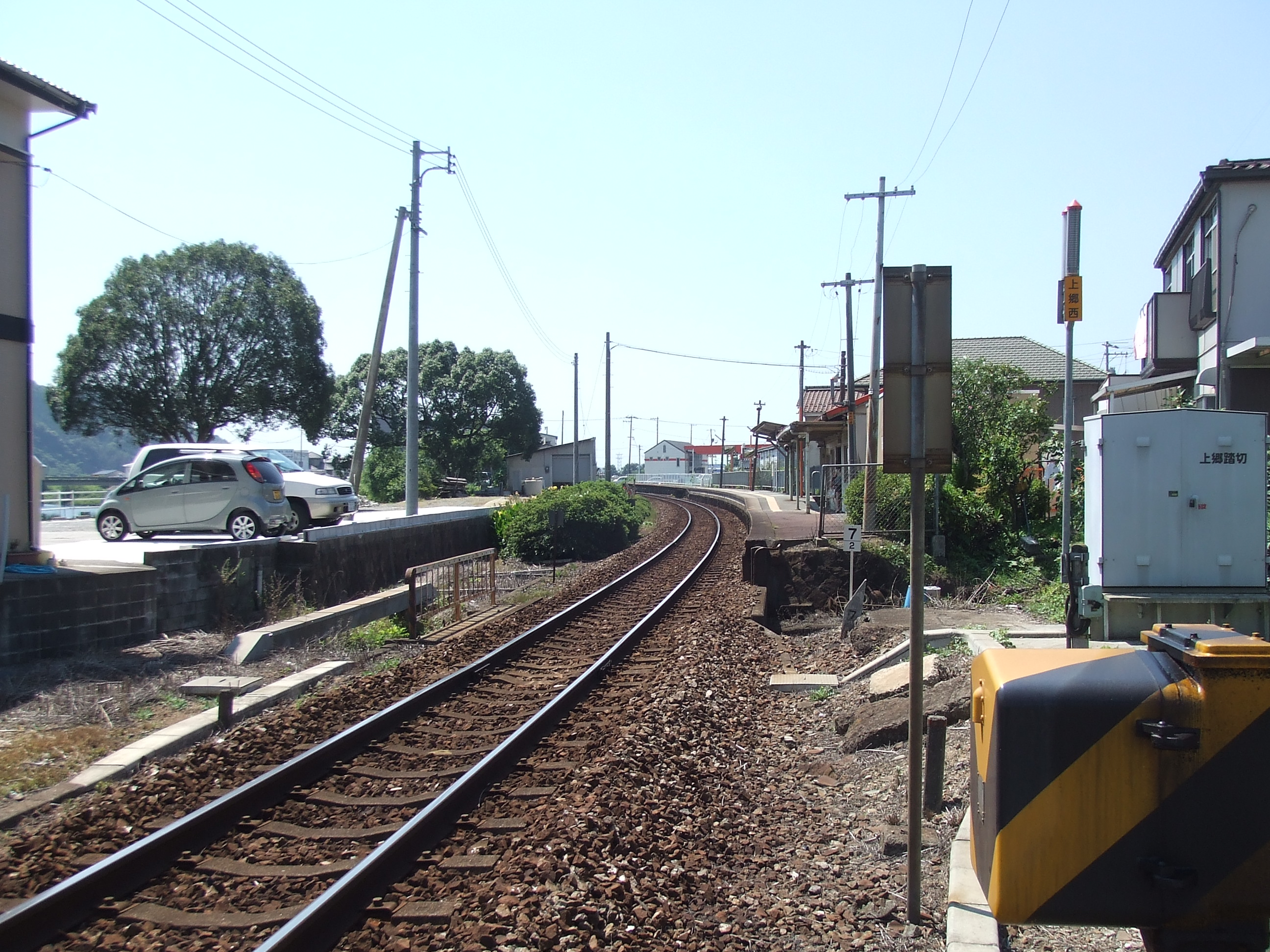
- Kamigō Station in August 2007

General information
- Location: 5-chōme-6 Ogōrishinmachi, Yamaguchi-shi, Yamaguchi-ken, 754-0031; Japan
- Coordinates: 34°6′58.78″N 131°24′6.55″E
- Owner: West Japan Railway Company
- Operator: West Japan Railway Company
- Line: Yamaguchi Line
- Distance: 2.7 km (1.7 miles) from Shin-Yamaguchi
- Platforms: 1 side platform
- Tracks: 1
- Connections: Bus stop

Other information
- Status: Unstaffed
- Website: Official website

History
- Opened: 2 November 1914

Passengers
- FY2020: 619

Services
Preceding station	JR West	Following station
Suō-Shimogō towards Shin-Yamaguchi	Yamaguchi Line Local	Nihozu towards Masuda
Location
- Location within Yamaguchi Prefecture Location within Japan

}

Kamigō Station (上郷駅, Kamigō-eki) is a passenger railway station located in the city of Yamaguchi, Yamaguchi Prefecture, Japan. It is operated by the West Japan Railway Company (JR West).

== Lines ==
Kamigō Station is served by the JR West Yamaguchi Line, and is located 2.7 kilometers from the terminus of the line at Shin-Yamaguchi.

== Station layout ==
The station consists of one side platform serving a single bi-directional track. The entrance to the station is located at the north end of the platform. A shelter and automatic ticket machine are also located there. The station is unattended.

== History ==
Kamigō Station was opened on 2 November 1914 with the extension of the Yamaguchi Line from Ogōri Station (present-day Shin-Yamaguchi) to Ōtoshi Station. With the privatization of the Japan National Railway (JNR) on 1 April 1987, the station came under the aegis of the West Japan railway Company (JR West).

== Passenger statistics ==
In fiscal 2020, the station was used by an average of 619 passengers daily.

== Surrounding area ==
- Japan National Route 9
- Yamaguchi Gakugei University
- Yamaguchi Municipal Kamigo Elementary School

== See also ==
- List of railway stations in Japan
