= Saburobe Nakai IV =

Japanese businessman (1851–1932)

Saburobe Nakai IV 中井三郎兵衛 (4代)
- Born: 12 April 1851
- Died: 17 March 1932 (aged 80)
- Occupations: Businessperson member of kyoto prefectural and municipal assemblies
- Parent: Saburobe Nakai III

Saburobe Nakai IV (中井 三郎兵衛 (4代), Nakai Saburobe (Yon-dai); 12 April 1851 – 17 March 1932), known by the name of Jigan (慈眼; lit. "merciful eyes") after retirement, was a Japanese businessperson. He was the head of a branch of the Mitsui family, which served for the industrial and cultural development of Kyoto as directors of many start-up companies at the time of the rise of Japanese industry and as a member of the Kyoto Prefectural and Municipal Assemblies.

== Biography ==
Saburobe Nakai IV was born on 12 April 1851, during the Kaei era as a member of the Ohara family. As Saburobe Nakai III did not have any children, he was adopted into the Nakai family and became the adopted son of Saburobe Nakai III at the age of three in 1853.

In 1863, he started to serve the Mitsui family in Kyoto and resigned in 1866. He made the family business, "Echisan Shoten", prosperous together with its founder, Saburobe Nakai III, and reorganised "Echisan Shoten" into an unlimited partnership and thereafter a limited liability company and expanded the lines of business by adding machine-made paper, first in Japan, to the original product handled, washi, and exerted himself for modernising its management.

In 1870, he inherited the name of "Saburobe". While holding the position of the president of "Nakai Shoten" (successor of the above-mentioned "Echisan Shoten", later, Japan Pulp and Paper Company), he organised the Paper Merchants Association of Kyoto and served as one of the directors of Kyoto Orimono, Tokyo Printing, Keizu Electric Tramway, and the Oji Paper Company.

Saburobe Nakai, president of Nakai Shoten, also served as a member of the Kyoto Prefectural Assembly for two years from 1881 and for three years from 1888 and as a member of the Kyoto City Assembly in 1901. In the Kyoto City Assembly, he spoke on the improvement of Maruyama Park many times. After resigning as a member of Kyoto City Assembly, from the end of the Meiji until the Taishō periods, he built signpost(s) and stone monument(s) as public services in the area of Kyoto Higashiyama and opened mountain trails around there.

Saburobe Nakai IV died on 17 March 1932.

Later, the garden of his retreat house was selected as a designated and registered cultural property of Kyoto City (scenic spot).
