= Landed property =

Income-generating land owned by gentry

In real estate, a landed property or landed estate is a property that generates income for the owner (typically a member of the gentry) without the owner having to do the actual work of the estate.

In medieval Western Europe, there were two competing systems of landed property; manorialism, inherited from the Roman villa system, where a large estate is owned by the Lord of the manor and leased to tenants; and the family farm or Hof owned by and heritable within a commoner family (cf. yeoman), inherited from Germanic law.

A gentleman farmer is the largely historic term for a country gentleman who has a farm as part of his estate and farms mainly for pleasure rather than for profit. His acreage may vary from under ten to hundreds of acres. The gentleman farmer employed labourers and farm managers. However, according to the 1839 Encyclopedia of Agriculture, he "did not associate with these minor working brethren". The chief source of income for the gentleman farmer was derived not from any income that his landed property may generate; he had either access to his own private income, worked as a professional and/or he owned a large business elsewhere, or all three.

Modern landed property often consists of housing or industrial land, generating income in the form of rents or fees for services provided by the facilities on the land, such as port facilities. Owners often commission an estate map to help manage their estate as well as serving as a status symbol.

Landed property was a key element of feudalism, and freed the owner for other tasks, such as government administration, military service, the practice of law, or religious practices.

In later times, the dominant role of landed estates as a basis of public service faded. Development of manufacturing and commerce created capitalist means of obtaining income, but ordinarily demanding the attention of the owner. At roughly the same time, governments began imposing taxes to fund government bureaus and the military, so that people of talent could perform government services for salaries without need for the proceeds of ownership of farmland.

Much of the United States, typically New England, Pennsylvania, and most states west of the original colonies, never had a landed aristocracy, so their armed forces and government agencies could never be organized on the basis of a landed aristocracy.

== See also ==
- Absentee landlord
- Absentee business owner
- Feudalism
- Gentleman farmer
- Gentry
- Georgism
- Landed gentry
- Land tenure
- Manorialism
- Old money
