= Yabara Station =

Railway station in Yamaguchi, Yamaguchi Prefecture, Japan

Yabara Station 矢原駅
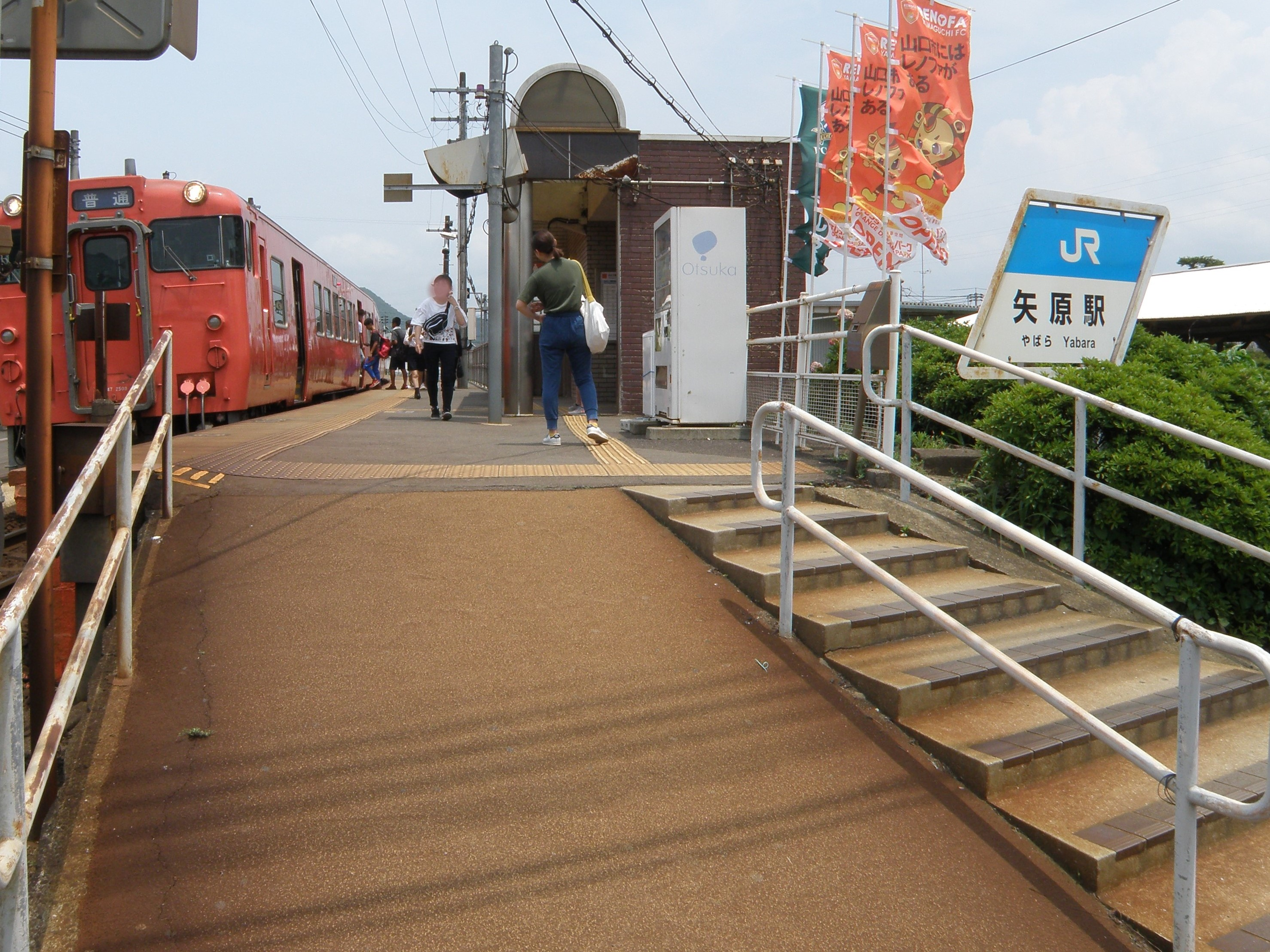
- Yabara Station in June 2019

General information
- Location: Yabara, Yamaguchi-shi, Yamaguchi-ken 753-0861; Japan
- Coordinates: 34°9′1.57″N 131°26′44.50″E
- Owner: West Japan Railway Company
- Operator: West Japan Railway Company
- Line: Yamaguchi Line
- Distance: 8.6 km (5.3 miles) from Shin-Yamaguchi
- Platforms: 1 side platform
- Tracks: 1
- Connections: Bus stop

Other information
- Status: Unstaffed
- Website: Official website

History
- Opened: 1 October 1935; 91 years ago

Passengers
- FY2020: 503

Services
Preceding station	JR West	Following station
Ōtoshi towards Shin-Yamaguchi	Yamaguchi Line Local	Yudaonsen towards Masuda
Location
- Location within Yamaguchi Prefecture Location within Japan

Yabara Station (矢原駅, Yabara-eki) is a passenger railway station located in the city of Yamaguchi, Yamaguchi Prefecture, Japan. It is operated by the West Japan Railway Company (JR West).

== Lines ==
Yabara Station is served by the JR West Yamaguchi Line, and is located 8.6 kilometers from the terminus of the line at Shin-Yamaguchi.

== Station layout ==
The station consists of one side platform serving a single bi-directional track. The sole entrance is located at the west end of the platform. A sheltered waiting area is located there as well, along with toilets and an automated ticket machine. The station is unattended.

== History ==
Yabara Station was opened on 1 October 1935. With the privatization of the Japan National Railway (JNR) on 1 April 1987, the station came under the aegis of the West Japan railway Company (JR West).

== Passenger statistics ==
In fiscal 2020, the station was used by an average of 503 passengers daily.

== Surrounding area ==
- Yamaguchi Municipal Otoshi Elementary School
- Yamaguchi Municipal Hirakawa Elementary School
- Yamaguchi Municipal Hirakawa Junior High School

== See also ==
- List of railway stations in Japan
