= Nihozu Station =

Railway station in Yamaguchi, Yamaguchi Prefecture, Japan

Nihozu Station 仁保津駅
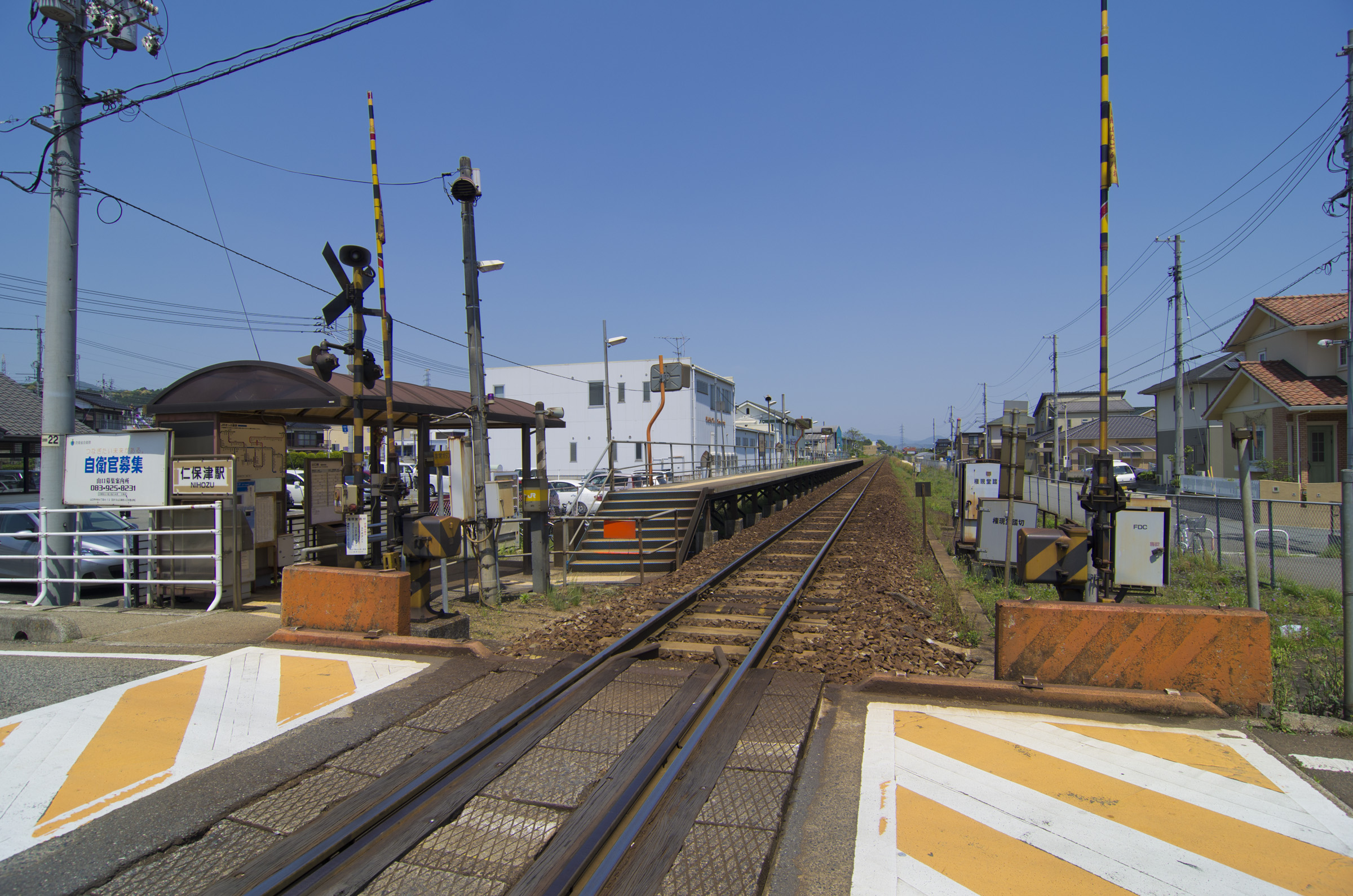
- Nihozu Station in May 2012

General information
- Location: Ogōrikamigō Nihozu-kami, Yamaguchi-shi, Yamaguchi-ken, 754-0001; Japan
- Coordinates: 34°7′43.84″N 131°24′55.34″E
- Owner: West Japan Railway Company
- Operator: West Japan Railway Company
- Line: Yamaguchi Line
- Distance: 4.6 km (2.9 miles) from Shin-Yamaguchi
- Platforms: 1 side platform
- Tracks: 1
- Connections: Bus stop

Other information
- Status: Unstaffed
- Website: Official website

History
- Opened: 10 April 1972; 54 years ago

Passengers
- FY2020: 383

Services
Preceding station	JR West	Following station
Kamigō towards Shin-Yamaguchi	Yamaguchi Line Local	Ōtoshi towards Masuda
Location
- Location within Yamaguchi Prefecture Location within Japan

Nihozu Station (仁保津駅, Nihozu-eki) is a passenger railway station located in the city of Yamaguchi, Yamaguchi Prefecture, Japan. It is operated by the West Japan Railway Company (JR West).

== Lines ==
Nihozu Station is served by the JR West Yamaguchi Line, and is located 4.6 kilometers from the terminus of the line at Shin-Yamaguchi.

== Station layout ==
The station consists of one side platform serving a single bi-directional track. The entrance to the station is located at the south end of the platform. A shelter and automatic ticket machine are also located there. The station is unattended.

== History ==
Nihozu Station was opened on 10 April 1972. With the privatization of the Japan National Railway (JNR) on 1 April 1987, the station came under the aegis of the West Japan railway Company (JR West).

== Passenger statistics ==
In fiscal 2020, the station was used by an average of 383 passengers daily.

== Surrounding area ==
- Chugoku Expressway Ogori IC
- Japan National Route 9
- Yamaguchi Prefectural Yamaguchi Agricultural High School
- Honmichi Western (Seibu) branch (ほんみち西部出張所)

== See also ==
- List of railway stations in Japan
