= Absentee landlord =

Person who rents a property, but does not live in the property's local economic region

In economics, an absentee landlord is a person who owns and rents out a profit-earning property, but does not live within the property's local economic region. The term "absentee ownership" was popularised by economist Thorstein Veblen's 1923 book of the same name, Absentee Ownership. However, some jurisdictions seek to extract money from absentee owners by taxing land. Absentee ownership has sometimes put the absentee owners at risk of loss.

== Ireland ==
Absentee landlords were a highly significant issue in the history of Ireland. In the 16th and 17th centuries, much of Ireland's land was confiscated from Catholic landowners by the Crown during the plantations of Ireland and granted to Protestant settlers from Great Britain. Many of these settlers and their descendants eventually returned to Britain while continuing to own their Irish estates, renting them out to local tenants. In 1782, Irish Patriot Party politician Henry Grattan claimed that absentee landlords earned approximately £800,000 per annum from their Irish estates and attempted to impose an additional tax on remittances sent to them. However, absentee landlords also reinvested their rental income into constructing roads and bridges in Ireland to improve local economies, many of which still exist today; one such landlord was Lord Palmerston, who went into debt to develop his estates in Sligo, an investment that eventually paid off.

By the 1800s, resentment towards these landlords grew, as not only were the absentee landlords all Protestant, but the goods produced on their estates were primarily exported to foreign markets. This system became particularly detrimental to the Irish public during the Great Famine, when, despite Ireland becoming a net importer of food, millions either died of starvation or disease or emigrated elsewhere. In the years following the famine, the Irish National Land League engaged in the Land War to address the issue of absentee landlords in Ireland. The issue was one of the contributing factors that led to the Irish revolutionary period, although it had largely been resolved by the British government in 1903 through the Land Acts.

== Prince Edward Island ==
An absentee landlord crisis was a key factor in Prince Edward Island's decision to become a part of Canada when the idea of Confederation was proposed in 1867. In the mid-1760s, a survey team divided the Island into 67 lots. On July 1, 1767, these properties were allocated to associates of George III by means of a lottery. Ownership of the land remained in the hands of British-based landlords, angering settlers on the island who were unable to gain title to land on which they worked and lived. Significant rent charges (to absentee landlords) created further anger. The land had been given to the absentee landlords with a number of conditions attached regarding upkeep and settlement terms; many of these conditions were not satisfied. The settlers spent decades trying to convince the Crown to confiscate the lots, however the descendants of the original owners generally held significant levels of influence with Crown officials and refused to give up the land.

In 1853, the colonial government on the island passed the Land Purchase Act, which empowered them to purchase lands from those owners who were willing to sell, and then resell the land to settlers for low prices. This scheme collapsed when the colonial government ran short of money to continue with the purchases. Many of these lands also were fertile, and were some of the key factors to sustaining Prince Edward Island's economy.

In 1864, the colonial government saw union with Canada as a possible solution to the landlord crisis. This followed a rent strike and riots on the island. At the Charlottetown Conference, delegates proposed a fund to purchase landlords' holdings if the Island joined Confederation. Several weeks later at the Quebec Conference this offer was withdrawn. The Island resolved not to enter Confederation as a result. The government refused offers from the other provinces and relented in 1873 only after the local economy was pushed near to collapse. Under the terms of union, Canada agreed to provide the Island with an $800 000 fund to purchase the remaining absentee holdings. In 1875, the Land Purchase Act was enacted to force owners of the large estates to sell their holdings to the provincial government.

The Island's experience with absentee landlords affects its land ownership laws to this day. Non-residents are not permitted to purchase land in excess of two hectares without prior approval from the cabinet. In 2009 an American was fined $29,000 for contravening these laws.

== Palestine ==
The Ottoman Empire embarked on a systematic land reform program in the second half of the 19th century. Two of the new laws were the 1858 land registration law and the 1873 land emancipation act.

Prior to 1858, land in Palestine, then a part of the Ottoman Empire since 1516, was cultivated or occupied mainly by peasants. Land ownership was regulated by people living on the land according to customs and traditions. Usually, the land was communally owned by village residents, though land could be owned by individuals or families.

In 1858 the Ottoman Empire introduced The Ottoman Land Code of 1858, requiring landowners to register ownership. The reasons behind the law were twofold. (1) to increase tax revenue, and (2) to exercise greater state control over the area. Peasants, however, saw no need to register claims, for several reasons:

- landowners were subject to military service in the Ottoman Army
- general opposition to official regulations from the Ottoman Empire
- evasion of taxes and registration fees to the Ottoman Empire

The registration process itself was open to misregistration and manipulation. Land collectively owned by village residents ended up registered to one villager, and merchants and local Ottoman administrators took the opportunity to register large areas of land to their own name. The result was land that became the legal property of people who had never lived on the land, while the peasants, having lived there for generations, retained possession, but became tenants of absentee owners.

The 1856 Emancipation Reform Decree and 1869 citizenship law was interpreted as giving Jews the right to own land in Ottoman Syria under their own name. The changing of this law (the change occurring at the same time as the freeing of the Africans in the United States and in South America and the emancipation of the serfs in Russia (held in slavery by the Russian landowning class) was a part of the worldwide 19th-century movement towards emancipation and civil rights for oppressed minorities. This 1873 secular land reform/civil rights law was popularly confused with religious law and it was held as a "humiliation to Islam that Jews should own a part of the Muslim Ummah". The confusion between religious and secular law made the laws (ended in 1873) against Jewish ownership of land 'religious laws'.

Over the course of the next decades land became increasingly concentrated on fewer hands; the peasants continued to work on the land, giving landlords a share of the harvest. This led to both an increased level of Palestinian nationalism as well as civil unrest. At the same time the area witnessed an increased flow of Jewish immigrants who did not restrict themselves to the cities where their concentration offered some protection from persecution. These new Jews came hoping to create a new future in what they regarded as the homeland of their ancestors. Organizations created to aid the Jewish migration to Palestine also bought land from absentee landowners. Jewish immigrants then settled on the land, sometimes replacing peasants already living there. A steady arrival of Jewish immigrants from 1882 led to several peasant insurgencies, recorded from as early as 1884–1886.

== See also ==
- Absentee business owner
- Anti-Rent War
- Georgism and mutualism (economic theories which explicitly address the issue)
- Landed property
