= Tokoro Ikutarō =

Japanese doctor

Junior Fourth Rank, Lower Grade 所 郁太郎 Tokoro Ikutarō
- Yabashi Ikutarō (矢橋 郁太郎)
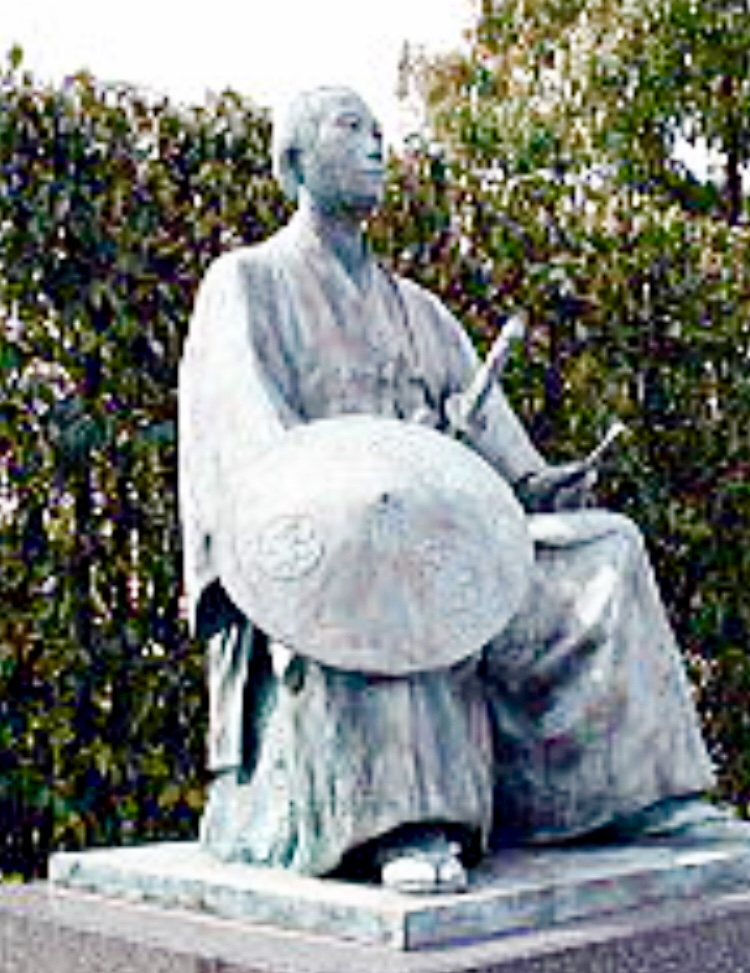
- Statue of Tokoro Ikutarō in Akasaka-juku (Nakasendō), his birthplace
- Born: March 11, 1838; Akasaka-juku (Nakasendō), Ōgaki Domain, Japan
- Died: April 7, 1865 (aged 27); Yamaguchi (city), Chōshū Domain, Japan
- Burial place: Yamaguchi (city), Chōshū Domain; Akasaka-juku (Nakasendō), Ōgaki Domain (his hair)
- Other name: Ishikawa Shunsai (石川 春斎)
- Children: Sumen (す免) (real daughter); Minokichi (美吉) (adopted son, formerly Yabashi Minokichi)
- Relatives: Yabashi Mataichi (矢橋 亦一) (real father); Tokoro Iori (所 伊織) (adoptive father); Sue (すゑ) (granddaughter)
- Military career
- Allegiance: Chōshū Domain
- court rank: Ju shi-i no ge (従四位下, Junior Fourth Rank, Lower Grade)
- Commands: Yugekitai (Chōshū Domain as the overseer) (軍監))
- Conflicts: the Coup of August 18, 1863; Ikedaya incident Kinmon incident

Tokoro Ikutarō (所 郁太郎; March 11, 1838 – April 7, 1865) was a doctor practicing Western medicine and also a patriot in the closing days of the Tokugawa shogunate. He is well known as the doctor who saved the life of Inoue Kaoru, who was severely wounded by would-be assassins. He was also a staff officer of Takasugi Shinsaku.

== Biography ==
Tokoro Ikutarō (ja), formerly Yabashi Ikutarō, was a doctor practicing Western medicine and a patriot in the closing days of the Tokugawa shogunate.

He was born in Akasaka-juku (Nakasendō) in 1838 as the 4th son of Yabashi Mataichi (矢橋亦一). Later this "Yabashi" family had to moved out of the homeland because Ikutarō became a supporter of the doctrine of restoring the emperor. At the age of 11 Ikutarō became the son-in-law of Tokoro Iori (所伊織) who also had to move out of the homeland for the very same reason.

Tokoro entered into Tekijuku. He had the reputation of being a brilliant student and enjoyed the companionship of Fukuzawa Yukichi, Ōmura Masujirō and so on.

He became the head of the Kyoto Residence of Chōshū Domain upon the recommendation of Katsura Kogorō (later Kido Takayoshi).

In 1864 Ikutaro succeeded in saving the life of Inoue Kaoru by sewing about 50 stitches of tatami needle in the wounds on the whole body without anesthesia because of emergency during the domestic war time. At that time Inoue Kaoru had been severely wounded by the attack of Zokuron-tō (Sodetogi-bashi Bridge (袖解橋) incident), received a near-fatal injury and had been appealing to Kaoru's brother for beheading right after the attack. The episode that then Inoue's mother, holding bloody Inoue, dissuaded his brother from beheading by saying "What's this? If he dies, he'll be unable to do his best for the country".

...Ikutaro said out loud, putting his mouth to Inoue Kaoru's ear, "I am Tokoro Ikutaro. Although you asked your elder brother for beheading, your mother forcibly stopped your elder brother from beheading to make you receive the operation, holding you by herself. Namely it is your mother that holds you at this moment. As you sustained really severe injuries, I'm not sure if my operation could be effective. But I cannot overlook your mother's painful feeling. You have to accept my operation and bear some pains for your mother's affection." It seemed that these words reached to the bottom of the ear of Duke Inoue and that he was deeply impressed. Immediately Ikutaro tucked up the sleeves of kimono with a tasuki, cleaned the wounds with shōchū and began to suture the wounds with the small tatami needle. Duke almost lost consciousness, so it seemed that the operation wasn't so painful for him. But when Ikutaro was suturing the wounds from right cheek to the lips, it seemed that he suffered pains...

This episode was introduced in the National Primary School Reader of the 5th Period. Before World War II everyone knew this episode.

Tokoro became staff officer of Takasugi Shinsaku. It is said that Tokoro Ikutarō didn't fawn although he rendered good service to the country and Chōshū and that even Takasugi Shinsaku with a fiery temperament followed Ikutaro's opinions even if they were against Takasugi's will.

Tokoro Ikutarō died of typhoid in camp at the age of 27.

He was enshrined in Kyoto Ryozen Gokoku Shrine in 1869.

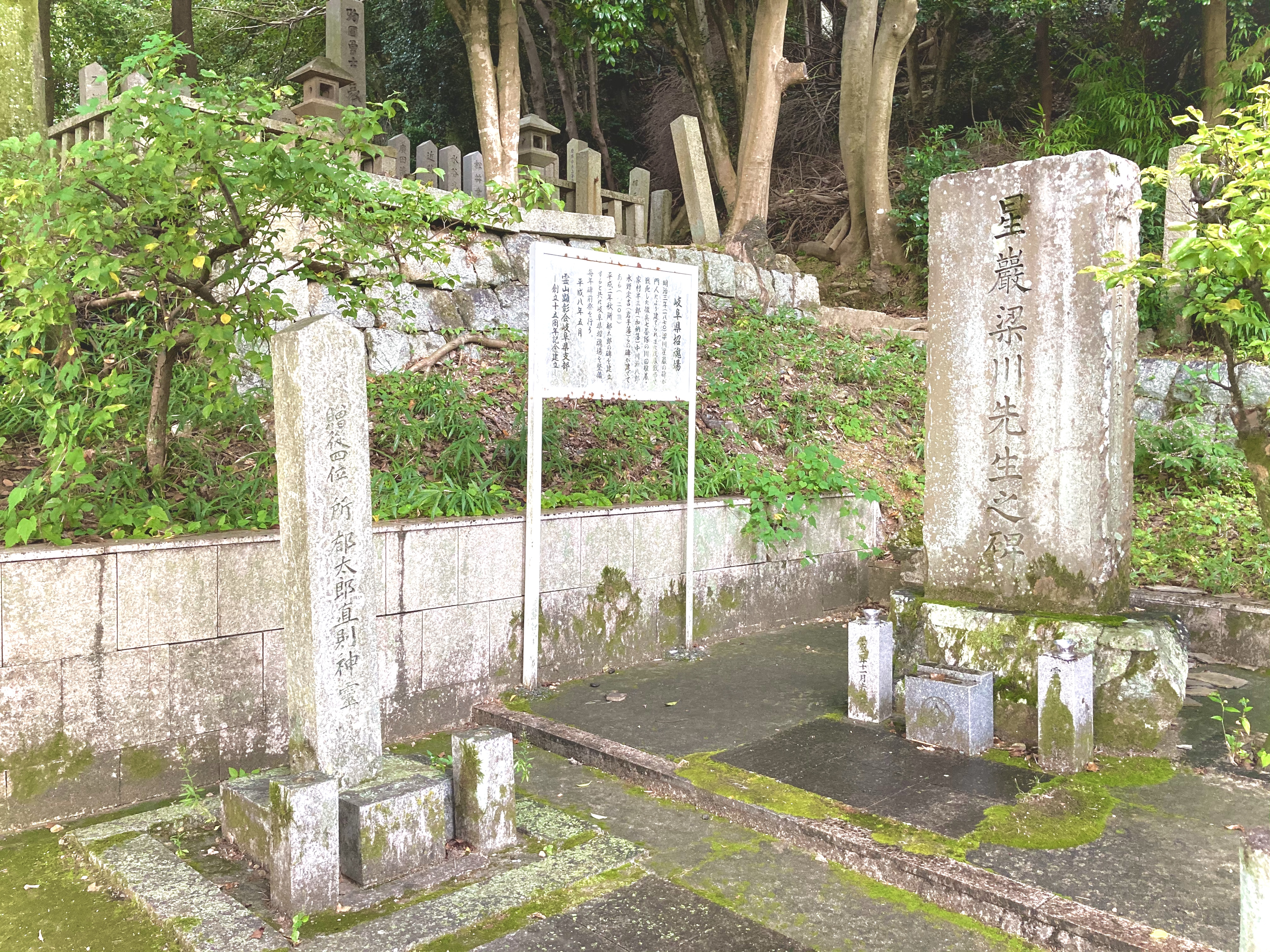
The Monuments of Yanagawa Seigan (right), Confucianist from Anpachi District of Gifu, and Tokoro Ikutarō (left) in Kyoto Ryozen Gokoku Shrine

Tokoro Ikutarō was awarded the title of ju shi-i no ge (従四位下, Junior Fourth Rank, Lower Grade) by the recommendation of Inoue Kaoru, Shinagawa Yajirō and so on.

Tokoro Ikutarō was also awarded by the erection of the monument at the site of the demolished Tokoro's house in Ono Town, where Ikutarō as a member of the Tokoros grew up, with the cooperation of Marquis Inoue Saburō, grandson of Inoue Kaoru.

Inoue Kaoru rehabilitated the extinct family, the Tokoros, by bringing up Ikutarō's nephew from the family, the Yabashis, where Ikutarō was born, whose name was Minokichi Yabashi, in Inoue's residence at Torii-Zaka, Tokyo (now, International House of Japan).

Thus the conferment of the Imperial court rank (Junior Fourth Rank, Lower Grade), the erection of the monument and the rehabilitation of the extinct Tokoro family, namely Inoue Kaoru's wishes, came to be realized with the help of the later generation.

The Statue of Tokoro Ikutarō was built in Akasaka-juku (Nakasendō) where he was born. Inscription says as follows.

...Tokoro Ikutarō, a patriot in the closing days of the Tokugawa shogunate, that our Akasaka Town gave birth to, proceeded with all his heart and devoted himself to the national affairs in all sincerity...

Alongside the statue of Inoue Kaoru in Yudaonsen there is the monument to honor Tokoro Ikutarō which says as follows.

...Tokoro Ikutarō saved the life of dying Inoue Kaoru miraculously. Thinking of Inoue's achievements in his later years, do not forget this Tokoro's operation. On New Year's day in 1865 when Takasugi Shinsaku raised an army and fought with Zokuron-to, a pro-Bakufu power, Ikutaro Tokoro was honorarily received as staff officer of Yugekitai and cooperated with Takasugi...
