= Ronbun hakase =

Doctoral degree peculiar to Japan

Ronbun Hakase (論文博士) is a method of obtaining a doctoral degree by way of dissertation without taking or completing a course of study. Ronbun (論文) means thesis or dissertation and hakase (博士) means doctoral degree in Japanese. It is also called Otsu Hakase (乙博士) or Otsu-gō Hakase (乙号博士). The other way of obtaining doctoral degree in Japan is katei hakase (課程博士), also called Kō Hakase (甲博士) or Kō-gō Hakase (甲号博士), which requires the applicant write a dissertation under the guidance of a doctoral advisor while taking a doctoral course of study. The character 乙 is often used at the beginning of the degree number of a ronbun hakase (e.g., 乙第12345号) while the character 甲 is used at the beginning of the degree number of katei hakase (e.g., 甲第67890号).

== Overview ==
Japanese universities with doctoral courses are generally qualified to confer doctoral degrees to someone with academic ability equivalent or superior to the doctoral degree recipients despite not completing a doctoral course of study at the degree-granting university. This type of doctoral degree is called ronbun hakase, which can be called PhD by thesis in English, though translated as "Doctoral Degree (Thesis / Dissertation)" by Kyoto University. This degree can be obtained by passing a dissertation review without the guidance of a doctoral advisor. The dissertation is reviewed by a committee at the degree-granting university, and the applicant is not required to take or complete a doctoral course at the university.

In contrast to ronbun hakase, there is also katei hakase, a doctoral degree through a course of study, translated into English as "Doctoral Degree (Course)" by Kyoto University. This is obtained by completing a course of study and dissertation under the guidance of a doctoral advisor and passing a dissertation review in the final stage of their course by a committee with their doctoral advisor as the chairperson. Katei means "course" and hakase means "doctoral degree" in Japanese.

Ronbun hakase is rare in comparison with katei hakase which is the primary way of obtaining a doctoral degree as obtaining a ronbun hakase requires the candidate to meet stringent academic background requirements such as having published more peer-reviewed papers than the degree-granting university requires at the time of the application, having published many non-peer-reviewed papers, having experience presenting at international conferences, or having experience as a committee member at an academic society, etc. Moreover, even if the university's examination determines the candidate is someone with advanced academic ability, they may not receive a ronbun hakase.

Some believe Japan's system of ronbun hakase should be abolished. On the other hand, some consider it important for promoting the transition to lifelong learning as part of the Ministry of Education, Culture, Sports, Science and Technology policy by conferring doctoral degrees to working individuals who can independently undertake research, have abunduant knowledge, and are evaluated to have academic ability equivalent or superior to those who have previously received doctoral degrees. While the proportion of ronbun hakase to katei hakase is decreasing, there are still many who have accumulated considerable experience in a government office or private research organization and cannot undertake a course due to work or personal obligations.

== In other countries ==
=== South Korea ===
Nonmun Baksa (Korean: 논문박사; Hanja: 論文博士), also called Guje Baksa (Korean: 구제박사; Hanja: 舊制博士), was a similar program previously offered at universities in South Korea. It was inherited from the old educational system established during the Japanese colonial period, and was only maintained temporarily to mitigate the shortage of doctoral degree holders after Korea's independence from Japan. After fulfilling its purpose, it was formally abolished on February 25, 1975.

== Degree holders ==
- Tokiharu Abe
- Hideroku Hara
- Mamoru Ozaki
- Kenkichi Yabashi
