= Mamoru Ozaki =

Japanese bureaucrat (1935–2026)

Mamoru Ozaki (尾崎 護, Ozaki Mamoru; 1935 – 27 May 2026) was a Japanese bureaucrat.

== Life and career ==
Mamoru Ozaki was born in 1935, and graduated from University of Tokyo in 1958. After the graduation, he entered the Ministry of Finance and moved up through the ranks to the level of Director-General of the Tax Bureau, the Commissioner of National Tax Administration Agency and Vice‐Minister of Finance.

In 1988, he led the introduction of consumption tax under the Cabinet of Noboru Takeshita.

In 1994, he became the president of National Finance Corporation (from 1999, National Life Finance Corporation).

In 2002, he was granted the degree of Doctor of Philosophy in Law for his study of Zaisei seisaku eno shiten : Zaisei saikensaku no kaiko to mosaku〈The Perspective to Fiscal Policy：The Reviews and Seeks of Fiscal Consolidation〉 from Waseda University according to the system of Ronbun Hakase peculiar to Japan (Degree Number：乙第1669号).

He successively held the posts of the chairman of Yazaki Memorial Foundation for Science and Technology, the advisor of Yazaki and the chairman of History and Folklore Museum Promotion Association.

In 2019, the Order of the Sacred Treasure, Gold and Silver Star was bestowed on him.

Ozaki published books such as Zei no jōshiki〈Heisei 13 nendo-ban〉[Common Sense in Tax〈2001 version〉] (Nikkei Business Publications).

Ozaki died on 27 May 2026, at the age of 91.

== Publications ==
- 『G7の税制』(Diamond)
- 『経綸のとき』(Toyo Keizai)
- 『低き声にて語れ』(Shinchosha)
- 『上書保存』(Tokuma Bunko)
- 『税の常識〈平成13年度版〉』 (Nikkei Business Publications)
