= Saburobe Nakai III =

Japanese businessman (1821–1899)

Saburobe Nakai III 中井三郎兵衛 (3代)
- Born: 1821; Kyoto, Japan
- Died: 1899
- Occupation: businessperson founder of Japan Pulp and Paper Company
- Spouse: Kin Nakai
- Children: Saburobe Nakai IV
- Parent(s): Seikichi Nakai (Saburobe Nakai II); Kin Nakai

Saburobe Nakai III (中井 三郎兵衛 (3代), Nakai Saburobe (san-dai), 1821 - 1899) was a Japanese businessperson who was deeply involved in founding Mitsui Bank and Mitsui & Co., the head of branch family of Mitsui family and the founder of specialist trading company dealing in paper ranked first in Japan and third in the world, namely Japan Pulp and Paper Company.

== Biography ==
Saburobe Nakai III was born as the second son of Seikichi Nakai (Saburobe Nakai II) and Kin Nakai in Kyoto with the birth name, "Sanpei". He began to serve Mitsui family (later, Mitsui Zaibatsu) at the Kyoto headquarter at the age of 12.

In 1845 when he was serving Mitsui family as manager (bantō) at Mitsui Echigoya kimono fabric store, he succeeded the name of "Saburobe" and started Japanese traditional paper 'washi' dealer "Echisan Shoten" (now, Japan Pulp and Paper Company).

"Echisan Shoten", wholesale washi dealer, was started by Saburobe Nakai III with the permission of use of goodwill of Mitsui family due to the recognition for long-term achievements from the generation of Saburobe Nakai I. During Kaei Era, it grew into a well-known paper dealer. Then he was exceptionally allowed to use Maru-ni-koshi (丸に越), goodwill of Mitsui family (now, Logo of Mitsukoshi).

In 1859, he was exceptionally allowed to use Maru-ni-igeta-san (丸に井桁三), other goodwill of Mitsui (now, Symbol of Mitsui) again.

In 1870, after Saburobe Nakai III entrusted Saburobe Nakai IV with the management of Echisan Shoten, he restarted to serve Mitsui family and fulfilled his heavy responsibilities. He became "Sō-motojime", general manager, of "Ō-motokata", supervisory body, of all Mitsui Business Organisations at the request of Mitsui Hachirōemon VIII (Takayoshi) and was deeply involved in founding Mitsui Bank and Mitsui & Co. Especially in Mitsui Bank, he supported Minomura Rizaemon (:ja:) and Nakamigawa Hikojiro (:ja:) as its deputy head.

Saburobe also exerted himself for establishing Yokkaichi City Papers by financing together with the president of the Daiichi Bank, Shibusawa Eiichi.
