= Corporate dissolution =

Formal process of closing a business

Corporate dissolution, also known as corporate wind-down, refers to the formal process of closing a business entity. Dissolving a company may take several months, involve legal assistance, incur significant costs, and be emotionally taxing. The need to settle outstanding taxes and liabilities adds to the complexity.

Dissolving a corporation is governed by the laws of the jurisdiction in which the entity is incorporated, and broadly involves ensuring that all legal, financial, and operational obligations are settled before the company ceases to exist.

== See also ==
- Bankruptcy
- Judicial dissolution
- Liquidation
