= Ōtoshi Station =

Railway station in Yamaguchi, Yamaguchi Prefecture, Japan

Ōtoshi Station 大歳駅
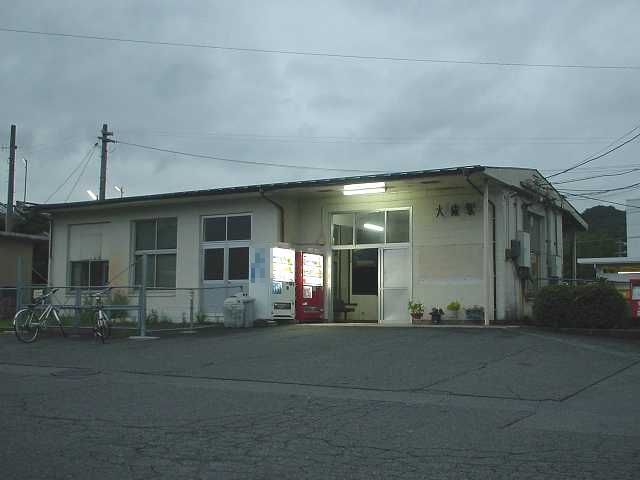
- Ōtoshi Station in July 2005

General information
- Location: Asada, Yamaguchi-shi, Yamaguchi-ken, 753-0871; Japan
- Coordinates: 34°8′50.26″N 131°25′59.03″E
- Owner: West Japan Railway Company
- Operator: West Japan Railway Company
- Line: Yamaguchi Line
- Distance: 7.3 km (4.5 miles) from Shin-Yamaguchi
- Platforms: 2 side platforms
- Tracks: 2
- Connections: Bus stop

Other information
- Status: Unstaffed
- Website: Official website

History
- Opened: 20 February 1913; 113 years ago

Passengers
- FY2020: 178

Services
Preceding station	JR West	Following station
Nihozu towards Shin-Yamaguchi	Yamaguchi Line Local	Yabara towards Masuda
Location
- Location within Yamaguchi Prefecture Location within Japan

Ōtoshi Station (大歳駅, Ōtoshi-eki) is a passenger railway station located in the city of Yamaguchi, Yamaguchi Prefecture, Japan. It is operated by the West Japan Railway Company (JR West).

== Lines ==
Ōtoshi Station is served by the JR West Yamaguchi Line, and is located 7.3 kilometers from the terminus of the line at Shin-Yamaguchi.

== Station layout ==
The station consists of two ground-level opposed side platforms connected by a footbridge. The station building and sole entrance is located at the northeast end of the station. An automatic ticket machine is also located there. The station is unattended.

=== Platforms ===
1	■ Yamaguchi Line	for Shin-Yamaguchi
2	■ Yamaguchi Line	for Yamaguchi and Tsuwano

== History ==
Ōtoshi Station was opened on 20 February 1913. With the privatization of the Japan National Railway (JNR) on 1 April 1987, the station came under the aegis of the West Japan railway Company (JR West).

== Passenger statistics ==
In fiscal 2020, the station was used by an average of 178 passengers daily.

== Surrounding area ==
- Yamaguchi Prefectural Yamaguchi Comprehensive Support School
- Yamaguchi City Otoshi Regional Exchange Center (former Yamaguchi City Hall Otoshi Branch Office, Otoshi Community Center)
- Honmichi Western (Seibu) branch (ほんみち西部出張所)

== See also ==
- List of railway stations in Japan
