= Kenzaburo Hara (disambiguation) =

Kenzaburo Hara (原健三郎) may refer to:

- Kenzaburo Hara (IJN officer), commander of the Japanese forces at the Battle of Sunda Strait in 1942
- Kenzaburo Hara (legislator) (1907–2004) Japan's longest serving legislator
