= Absentee business owner =

An absentee business owner is a business owner who does not personally manage the business or does not live in the community in which the business operates, but owns it.

== Research ==
Studies show that money spent locally circulates back into the community three times as much when it is not spent with an absentee-owned business. Local currency has been implemented in some communities as a countermeasure to this effect. Neighborhood investment, in which members of the community are given opportunities to become partial owners of new developments, is another method.

In Brazil, studies found that more than a third of the profits generated from tourism were exported to absentee business owners. In Vietnam, the economic expansion of the 1990s was associated with a rise in absentee business owners. There has also been concern that tourism profits in Southern Africa go to absentee business owners.

== Risks ==
Absentee business owners can be more vulnerable to theft by employees, especially when record keeping is turned over to employees, unless proper internal controls and review are implemented. In the United States, many business-owning military reservists have become absentee business owners during long tours of duty in Iraq and Afghanistan. Conducting thorough due diligence is critical when purchasing an absentee business. This includes reviewing financial records, assessing the business's reputation, and evaluating the existing management structure. Skipping this step can lead to unforeseen problems.

== See also ==
- Absentee landlord
- Successor company
- Corporate dissolution
