= Hiroshi Hara =

Hiroshi Hara may refer to:

- Hiroshi Hara (architect) (1936–2025), Japanese architect
- Hiroshi Hara (botanist) (1911–1986), Japanese botanist
