= Yudaonsen Station =

Railway station in Yamaguchi, Yamaguchi Prefecture, Japan

Yudaonsen Station 湯田温泉駅
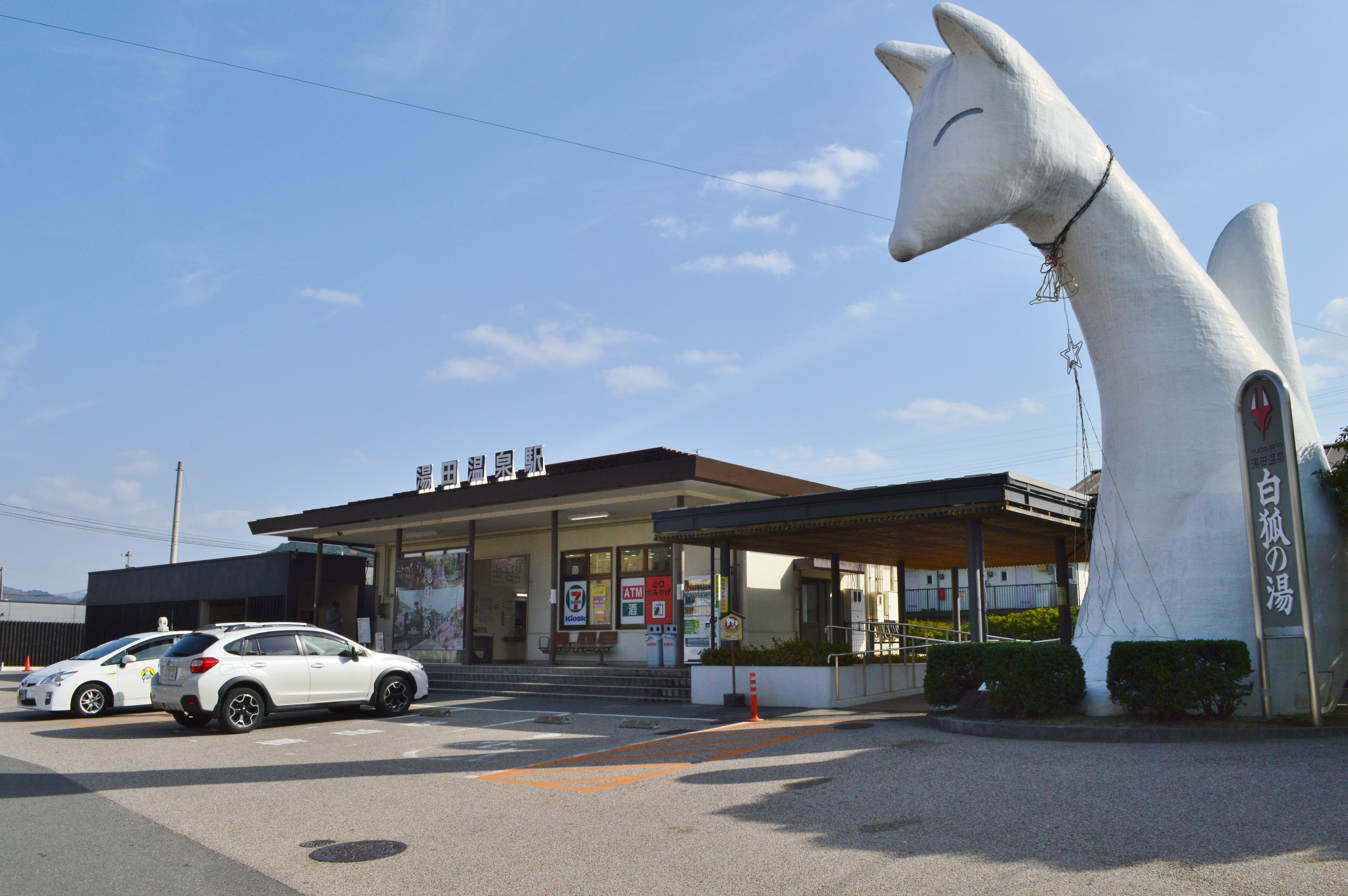
- Yudaonsen Station and "Byakkonoyu Onsen" with a sculpture of white fox

General information
- Location: Imai-chō 4-26, Yamaguchi-shi, Yamaguchi-ken 753-0054; Japan
- Coordinates: 34°9′35.26″N 131°27′36.47″E
- Owner: West Japan Railway Company
- Operator: West Japan Railway Company
- Line: Yamaguchi Line
- Distance: 10.3 km (6.4 miles) from Shin-Yamaguchi
- Platforms: 1 side platform
- Tracks: 1
- Connections: Bus stop

Other information
- Status: Unstaffed
- Website: Official website

History
- Opened: 20 February 1913; 113 years ago
- Former names: Yuda (until 1961)

Passengers
- FY2020: 842

Services
Preceding station	JR West	Following station
Yabara towards Shin-Yamaguchi	Yamaguchi Line Local	Yamaguchi towards Masuda
Location
- Location within Yamaguchi Prefecture Location within Japan

Yudaonsen Station (湯田温泉駅, Yudaonsen-eki) is a passenger railway station located in the city of Yamaguchi, Yamaguchi Prefecture, Japan. It is operated by the West Japan Railway Company (JR West).

== Lines ==
Yudaonsen Station is served by the JR West Yamaguchi Line, and is located 10.3 kilometers from the terminus of the line at Shin-Yamaguchi. The limited express Super Oki and rapid sightseeing train SL Yamaguchi (steam train) also stop here.

== Station layout ==
The station consists of one side platform serving a single bi-directional track. The station building and sole entrance is located at the northeast end of the station. An automatic ticket machine is also located there. The station is unattended.

== History ==
Yudaonsen Station was opened on 20 February 1913 as Yuda Station (湯田駅). It was renamed 20 March 1961. With the privatization of the Japan National Railway (JNR) on 1 April 1987, the station came under the aegis of the West Japan railway Company (JR West).

== Passenger statistics ==
In fiscal 2020, the station was used by an average of 842 passengers daily.

== Surrounding area ==
Although it calls itself Yuda "Onsen" station, the hot spring town of Yuda Onsen is about 400 meters along the prefectural road that extends north from the station. At the southern end of the hot spring town is the Nakahara Chuya Memorial Museum.

== See also ==
- List of railway stations in Japan
