= Juroku Bank =

Japanese bank

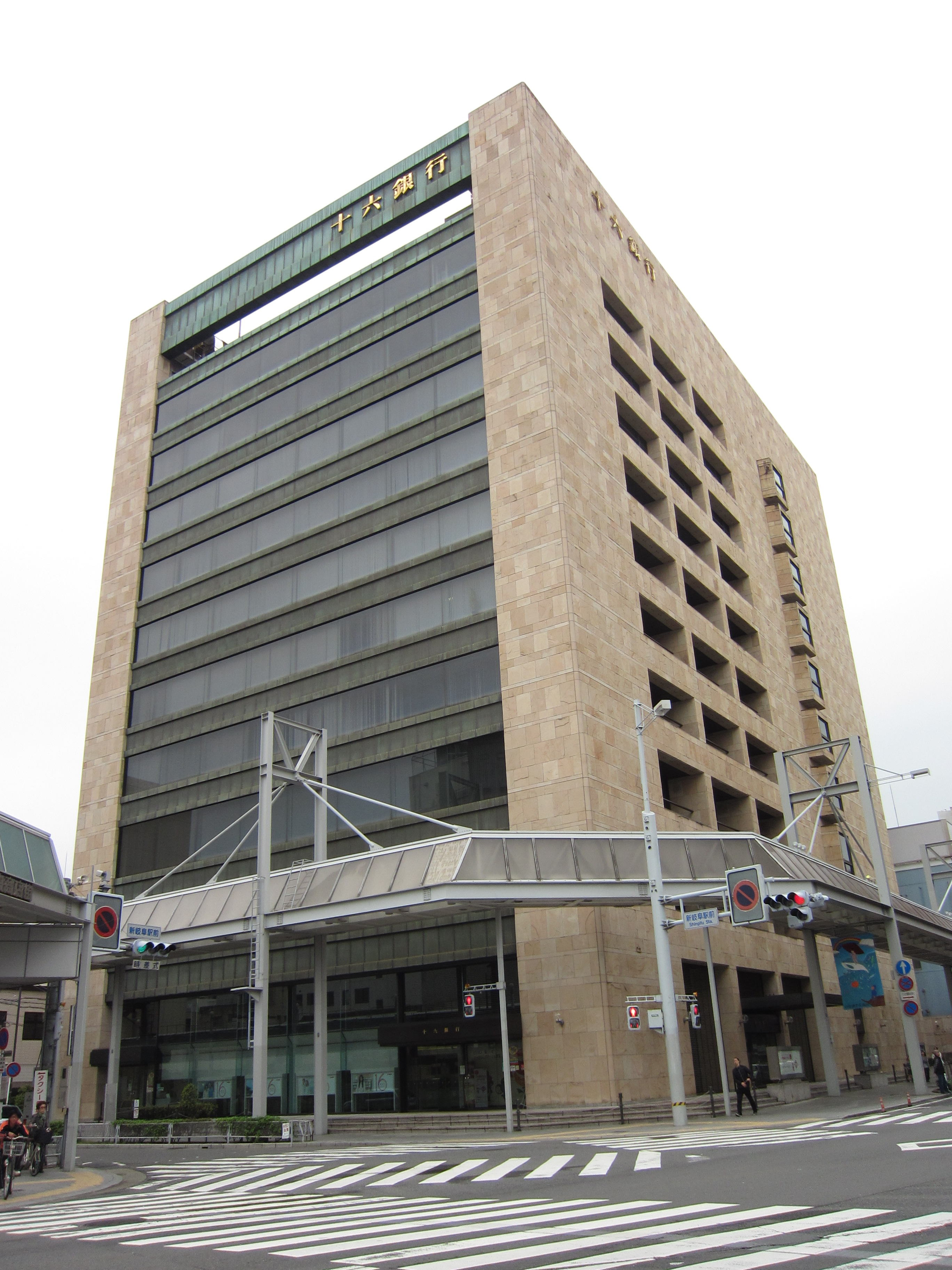
Juroku Bank Head Store

Juroku Bank (十六銀行, Jūroku ginkō) is a Japanese regional bank founded in Gifu, Gifu Prefecture as the 16th National Bank in 1877, which was reorganized to the ordinary commercial bank and renamed to Juroku Bank in 1896.

It has been strengthening comprehensive financial services while experiencing a series of bank mergers. Its shares of stock were listed in 1969 on the first section of Tokyo Stock Exchange and Nagoya Stock Exchange and have been traded as TYO: 8356. In 2012, it merged with Gifu Bank as the surviving bank.

== See also ==
- Tom and Jerry#Outside the United States
