= Fumio Takagi =

Fumio Takagi (高木 文雄, Takagi Fumio; April 6, 1919 – February 14, 2006) was a Japanese high-level official.

== Career ==
Fumio Takagi entered the Ministry of Finance in 1943 after the graduation from the Tokyo Imperial University. He moved up through the ranks to the level of Director-General of the Tax Bureau, Deputy Vice Minister, and Vice‐Minister of Finance in 1974. In 1976, he became the president of Japan National Railway, in 1984, the president of Yokohama Minatomirai 21 and in 1982, the president of Pacifico Yokohama.
