= Hideroku Hara =

Japanese legal scholar

- Born: 1956 (age 69–70); Japan
- Education: Waseda University (Doctor of Philosophy in Law); Hitotsubashi University (Master of Laws ・ B.Com.)
- Occupation: Professor emeritus at Shiga University
- Father: Otohiko Hara

Hideroku Hara (原 秀六; born 1956) is a Japanese legal scholar and professor emeritus at Shiga University. He was granted the degree of Doctor of Philosophy in Law for his study of The Legal Theory on the Distribution of the Synergistic Effects caused by Mergers from Waseda University. His research covers Commercial law, Corporate Law and Securities.

== Career ==
He first became assistant professor at Nagoya University of Commerce & Business and later was appointed associate professor and then full professor at Shiga University. In 2002, Hara was granted a Doctor of Philosophy in Law for his study of Gappei Shinajī Bunpai no Hōri [The Legal Theory on the Distribution of Synergistic Effects caused by Mergers] from Waseda University under the ronbun hakase system. In 2020, he was appointed professor emeritus by Shiga University.

== Selected publications ==
=== Books ===
- Kigyō Soshiki Hōmu [Legal Practice on Business Organizations], Zeimu Keiri Kyokai (1997)

ISBN 4419025069

- Gappei Shinajī Bunpai no Hōri [The Legal Theory on the Distribution of the Synergistic Effects caused by Mergers], Chuokeizai-Sha (2000)

ISBN 4502781533

=== Articles ===
- "Haitō Seigen Kitei ni okeru Tōsan Yobō Kinō – Shihon ni kansuru San Gensoku no Saikentō -" ["The Function of the Regulation Limiting Dividends in Preventing Bankruptcies – Reconsideration of three principles concerning the capital stock system – "], The Hitotsubashi review 97(4) : 557-76 (1987)
- "Kigyō Shūdan-nai ni okeru futōna Torihiki no Kisei – Renketsu Haitō Seido ni yoru Kisei -" ["Regulation of Unreasonable Transactions between Corporations in a Corporate Group"], Hitotsubashi journal of social sciences 12(2) : 27–46 (1987)
- "Gappei ni okeru「Kyōdō-teki Kōka」no Bunpai" ["The Distribution of Synergistic Effects Resulting from Merger"], Shihō 1994 (56) : 222-27 (1994)
- "Genshi-Kisei・Haitō-Kisei to Gappei Shinajī no Bunpai" ["Distribution of Synergistic Effects and Regulations on Stated Capital and Dividends"], Shiga Daigaku Keizai Gakubu Kenkyu Nenpo 4 : 107–122 (1997)
- "Hasan-Kanzai-Nin no Kengen to Dōsan Tanpo" ["The Trustee's Avoidance Powers and Article 9 Security Interests"], The Hikone Ronso 306 : 141-61 (1997)
- "Gappei Hiritsu no Kōsei Kakuho to Keisan-jō no Mondai" ["Enforcement of Fairness of Exchange Ratio and Problems in Accounting Regulations"], The Hikone Ronso 308 : 159-74 (1997)
- "Mirikō Keiyaku no Shori ni kansuru Hasan-Kanzai-Nin no Kenri oyobi Gimu" ["Treatment of Executory Contract under the Bankruptcy Code"], The Hikone Ronso 324 : 99–110 (2000)
- "Kaisha Keiei to Torishimariyaku no Risuku" ["Director's Risks in the Management"], The Hikone Ronso 342 : 209–218 (2003)
