= Japan Pulp and Paper Company =

Japanese company

Japan Pulp and Paper Company Limited
- Native name: 日本紙パルプ商事株式会社
- Company type: Public
- Traded as: TYO: 8032; TOPIX Component
- Industry: Pulp and paper, Logistics, Real Estate
- Founded: 1845; 181 years ago (as Echisan Shoten, thereafter Nakai Shoten)
- Founder: Saburobe Nakai III
- Headquarters: Forefront Tower, 3-12-1 Kachidoki, Chuo-ku, Tokyo, Japan
- Area served: Worldwide
- Key people: Akihiko Watanabe (president)
- Services: related to paper, paperboard, pulp, paper-related products and real estate
- Total equity: Stock listing (Common stock): Tokyo Stock Exchange, First Section Number of shares: 29,560,300 Common shares issued and outstanding: 15,021,551 (As of March 31, 2018)
- Owner: Oji Holdings Corp. (10.9%) Nippon Paper Industries Pension Fund (9.3%); Japan Pulp & Paper Co., Ltd. (8.1%); Japan Pulp & Paper Business Association (3.0%); Dimensional Fund Advisors LP (2.6%); Nomura Asset Management Co., Ltd. (2.1%); Hokuetsu Corp. (2.0%); Japan Pulp & Paper Employee Stock Ownership Plan (1.9%); Chuetsu Pulp & Paper Co., Ltd. (1.7%) The Vanguard Group, Inc. (1.6%) (As of 18 December 2020)
- Number of employees: Consolidated 4,298 Non-Consolidated 709 (As of June, 2020)
- Subsidiaries: Radms Paper Limited; Premier Paper Group Limited; CORELEX Co., Ltd. Ball & Doggett Group Pty Ltd; Spicers Paper (Malaysia) Sdn Bhd
- Website: https://www.kamipa.co.jp/eng/company/

Japan Pulp and Paper Company Limited (日本紙パルプ商事株式会社, Nihon Kami Parupu Shōji kabushiki kaisha) is a Japanese global pulp and paper trading company, first in Japan and third in the world by the amount of sales (sales in 2018 : ¥535.49B) after Veritiv Corporation (net sales in 2018 : $8.7B) and Central National-Gottesman (revenue in 2018 : $6.2B). Japan Pulp and Paper Company (JPP) distributes paper-related products and also operates real estate business. In 2019, JPP acquired Birmingham-headquartered PREMIER PAPER GROUP (PPG) for ¥5.2B and made PPG into its affiliate with PPG's management team remaining in place and all the 480 employees being kept on following the acquisition.

== Major activities ==
- Import and export, sale, distribution and manufacturing of paper, paperboard, pulp, paper-related products
- Real estate leasing; generation, sale and provision of electricity

== Segments ==
- Japan Wholesaling
- Non-Japan Wholesaling
- Paper Manufacturing and Processing
- Resources and Environment
- Real Estate Leasing
