= Naohisa Hara =

Japanese photographer

Naohisa Hara (原 直久, Hara Naohisa; born 1946) is a Japanese photographer.

Naohisa Hara was born in Chiba. He studied photography at Nihon University and graduated in 1969. Since 1972, he was working as assistant at College of Art, Nihon University.
