= Akasaka-juku (Nakasendō) =

Pre-modern Japan post-station along highway

Akasaka-juku 赤坂宿
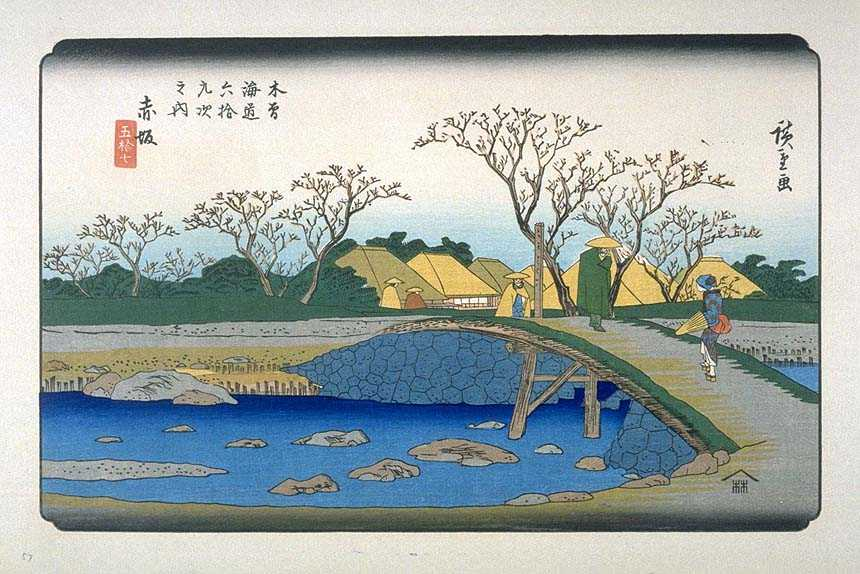
- Hiroshige's print of Akasaka-juku, part of the Sixty-nine Stations of the Kiso Kaidō series

General information
- Location: Ōgaki, Gifu (former Mino Province); Japan
- Coordinates: 35°23′25.4″N 136°34′57.2″E
- Elevation: 16 m (52 ft)
- System: post station
- Line: Nakasendō
- Distance: 432.1 km from Edo
Location
- Location within Gifu Prefecture Location within Japan

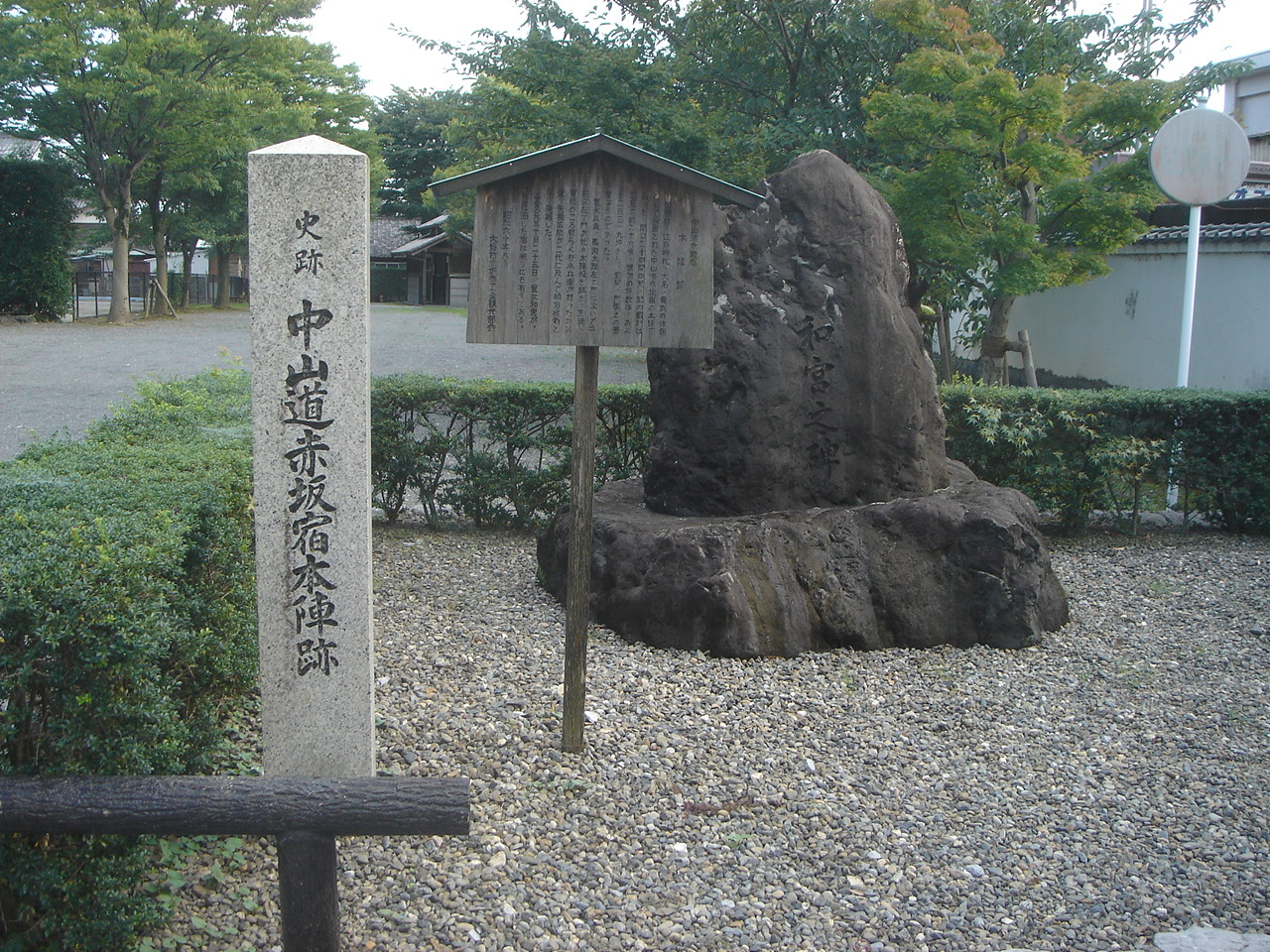
Marker denoting the location of the honjin in Akasaka-juku

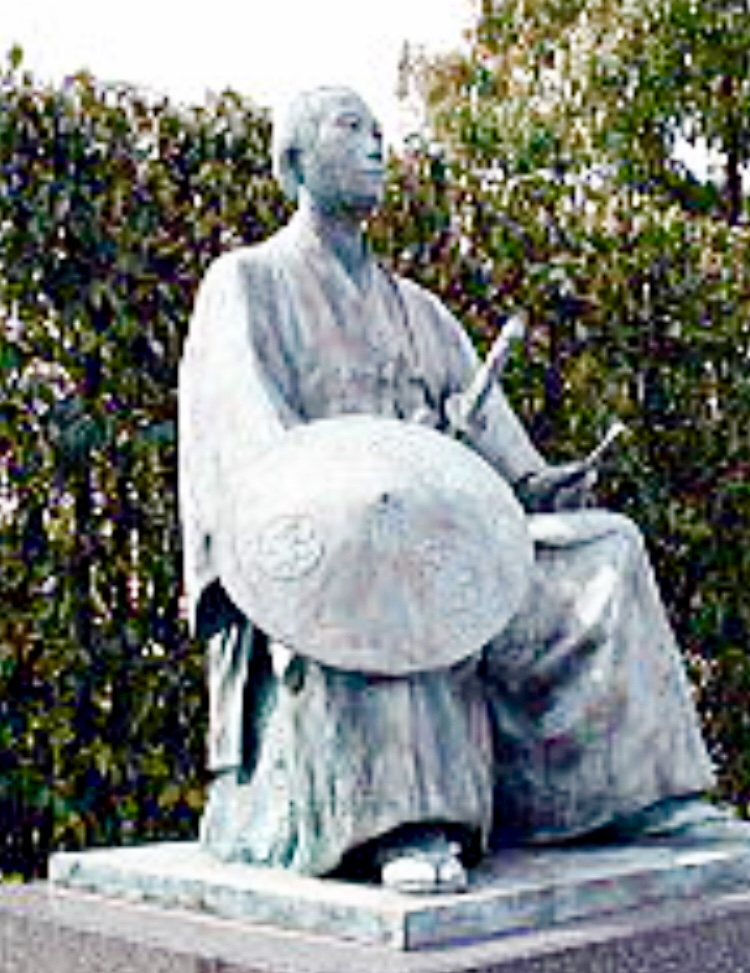
Statue of Ikutaro Tokoro (formerly Ikutaro Yabashi) in Akasaka-juku

Akasaka-juku (赤坂宿, Akasaka-juku) was the fifty-sixth of the sixty-nine stations of the Nakasendō connecting Edo with Kyoto in Edo period Japan. It is located in former Mino Province in what is now Akasaka neighborhood of the city of Ōgaki, Gifu Prefecture, Japan.

== History ==
Akasaka is an ancient place name, and appears in the late Heian period Heiji Monogatari as the location where Minamoto no Shigenari sacrificed his son to rescue Minamoto no Yoshitomo. The area is largely a flat landscape noted for its red earth (hence the name "Akasaka", which means "red slope"). The area was known in the Edo Period for its lime kilns producing quicklime for use as fertilizer, and for its marble processing industry. The village of Akasaka was at an intersection of the Nakasendō with a road to the Buddhist temple of Kegon-ji, the 33rd and final stop on the Saigoku Kannon Pilgrimage. The town was also an important port located on the Kuise-gawa River.

In the early Edo period, the system of post stations on the Nakasendō was formalized by the Tokugawa shogunate in 1602, and it became a stopping place for traveling merchants (Ōmi shōnin (近江商人)) who originated from Ōmi Province. It was also on the sankin-kōtai route used by various western daimyō to-and-from the Shogun's court in Edo. Akasaka is 432.1kilometers from Edo.

Per the 1843 "中山道宿村大概帳" (Nakasendō Shukuson Taigaichō) guidebook issued by the Inspector of Highways (道中奉行, Dōchu-būgyō), the town had a population of 1129 people in 292 houses, including one honjin, one waki-honjin, and 17 hatago.

== Modern Day ==
Today, you are able to see the old row houses and historical ruins from this Edo period post town. Also, for a more detailed look at the old post town of Akasaka-juku, a virtual tour has been created, which introduces the area at the beginning of the Tōkaidō and Nakasendō; in 1680, during the Enpō era; at the end of the Tokugawa Shogunate; and in modern times.

== Akasaka-juku in The Sixty-nine Stations of the Kiso Kaidō ==
Utagawa Hiroshige's ukiyo-e print of Akasaka-juku dates from 1835 -1838. The print depicts travelers crossing a wooden bridge across a small river. The thatched roofs of Akasaka-juku are on the far side. The setting is either spring or fall, as the travelers are wrapped in cloaks against the chill.

== Neighboring Post Towns ==
Nakasendō
Mieji-juku - Tarui-juku
