= Unitika =

Japanese textile and chemical company

Unitika Ltd.

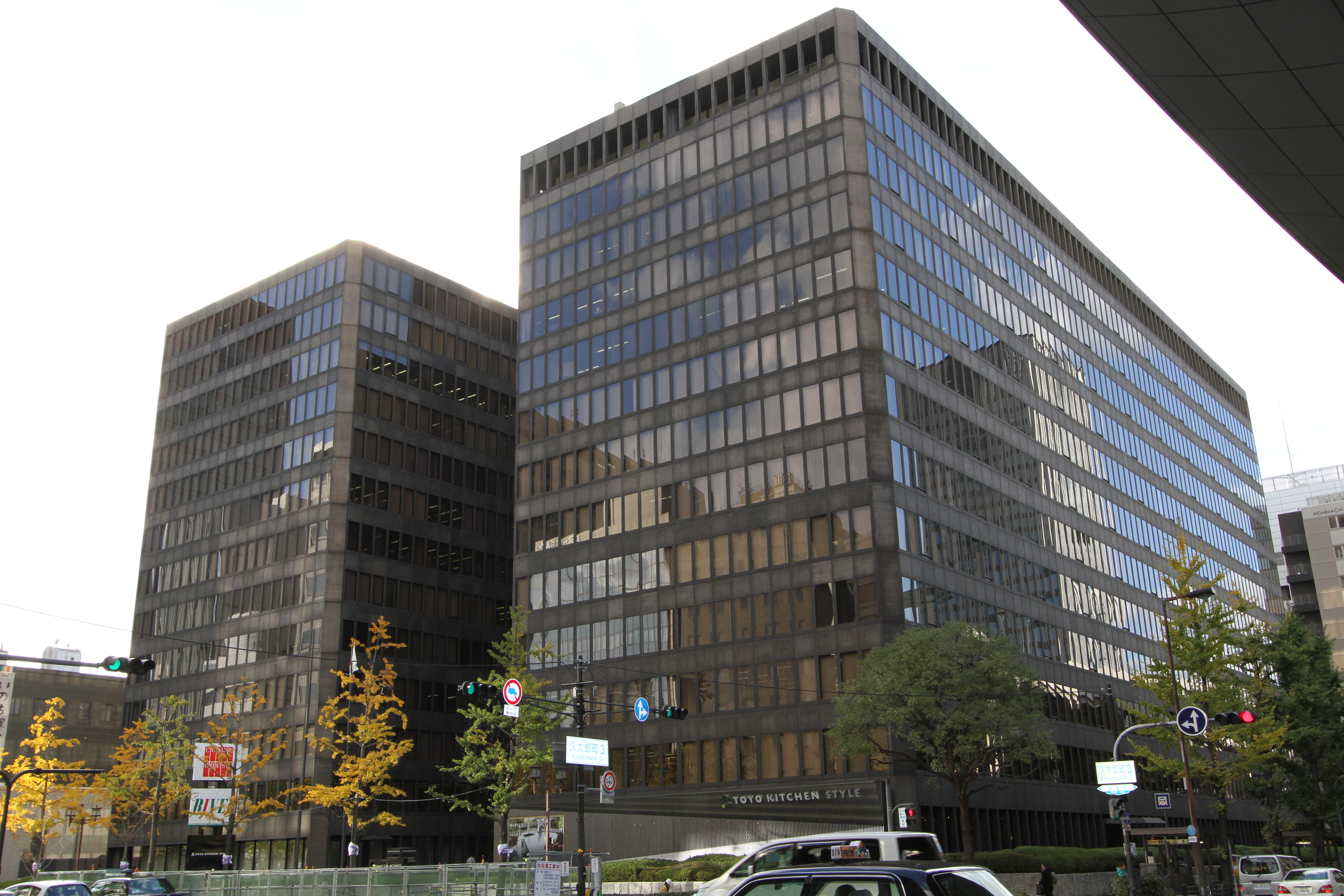
- Native name: ユニチカ株式会社
- Company type: Public (K.K)
- Traded as: TYO: 3103; OSE: 3103; Nikkei 225 Component
- Industry: Textile; Chemical
- Founded: June 19, 1889
- Headquarters: Osaka Center Bldg., 4-1-3 Kyutaro-machi, Chuo-ku, Osaka, 541-8566 Japan
- Key people: Hiroyuki Shime (CEO and President)
- Products: Textiles; Polymers; Nonwoven fabrics; Functional materials; Enzymes; Diagnostic regents; Dietary supplements
- Revenue: ▲$ 1.57 billion (FY 2013) (¥ 162.68 billion) (FY 2013)
- Net income: ▲$ 5.64 million (FY 2013) (¥ 583 million) (FY 2013)
- Number of employees: 4,534 (consolidated) (as of March 31, 2013)
- Website: Official website

Unitika Ltd (ユニチカ株式会社, Yunichika Kabushiki-gaisha) is a Japanese company based in Osaka. Primarily, the company produces various textiles, glass, plastics, and carbon fiber products. They are also known for their films, which are used in consumer products like athletic apparel and food packaging.

As of July 2009, they gained notoriety when they announced their new plastic, which exceeds ABS (acrylonitrile butadiene styrene) in terms of carbon emissions during production and heat/impact durability.

Unitika has 46 subsidiary companies across Japan, in Thailand, Vietnam, Indonesia, China, Hong Kong, Brazil and the US. The company is listed on the first section of the Tokyo Stock Exchange and the Osaka Securities Exchange and is a constituent of the Nikkei 225 stock index.

== Business segments and products ==
- Polymers
  - Films
  - Resins and plastic molding
  - Nonwoven
  - Biomass-based material (Terramac)
- Advanced materials
  - Glass cloth
  - Glass beads
  - Activated carbon fiber
  - Metallic fiber
  - Thermosetting resin
  - Aromatic polyimide
- Fibers and Textiles
  - Industrial materials
  - Garments, lifestyle materials, bedding
  - Biomass-based material (Terramac)
- Health and Amenity
  - Health
  - Medical
- Others
  - Environmental survey and analysis
  - Real estate services, operation of leisure facilities (such as swimming schools and golf courses), software design, and mechanical parking facilities

== Gallery ==
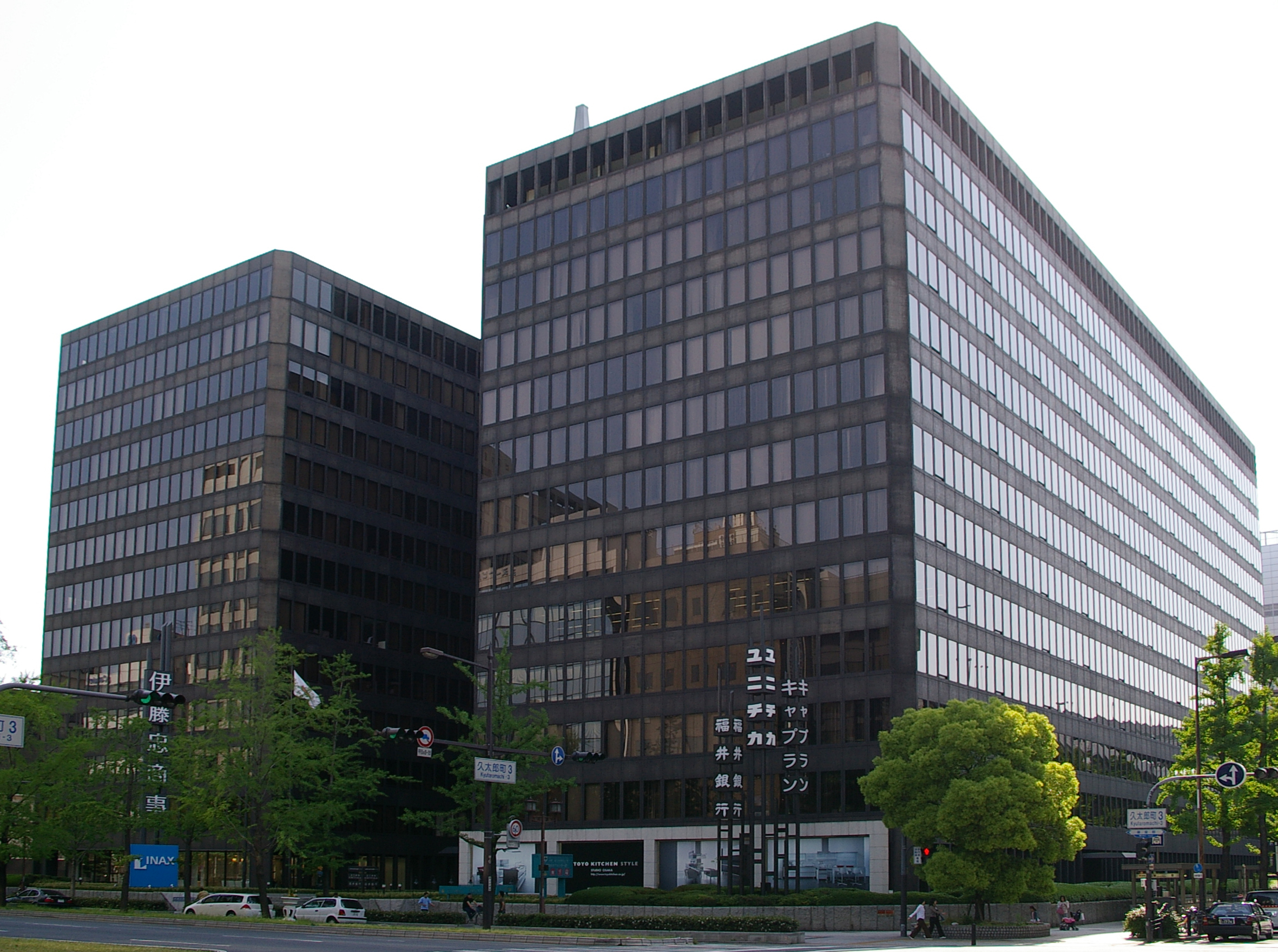
Unitika's head office in the Osaka Center Building

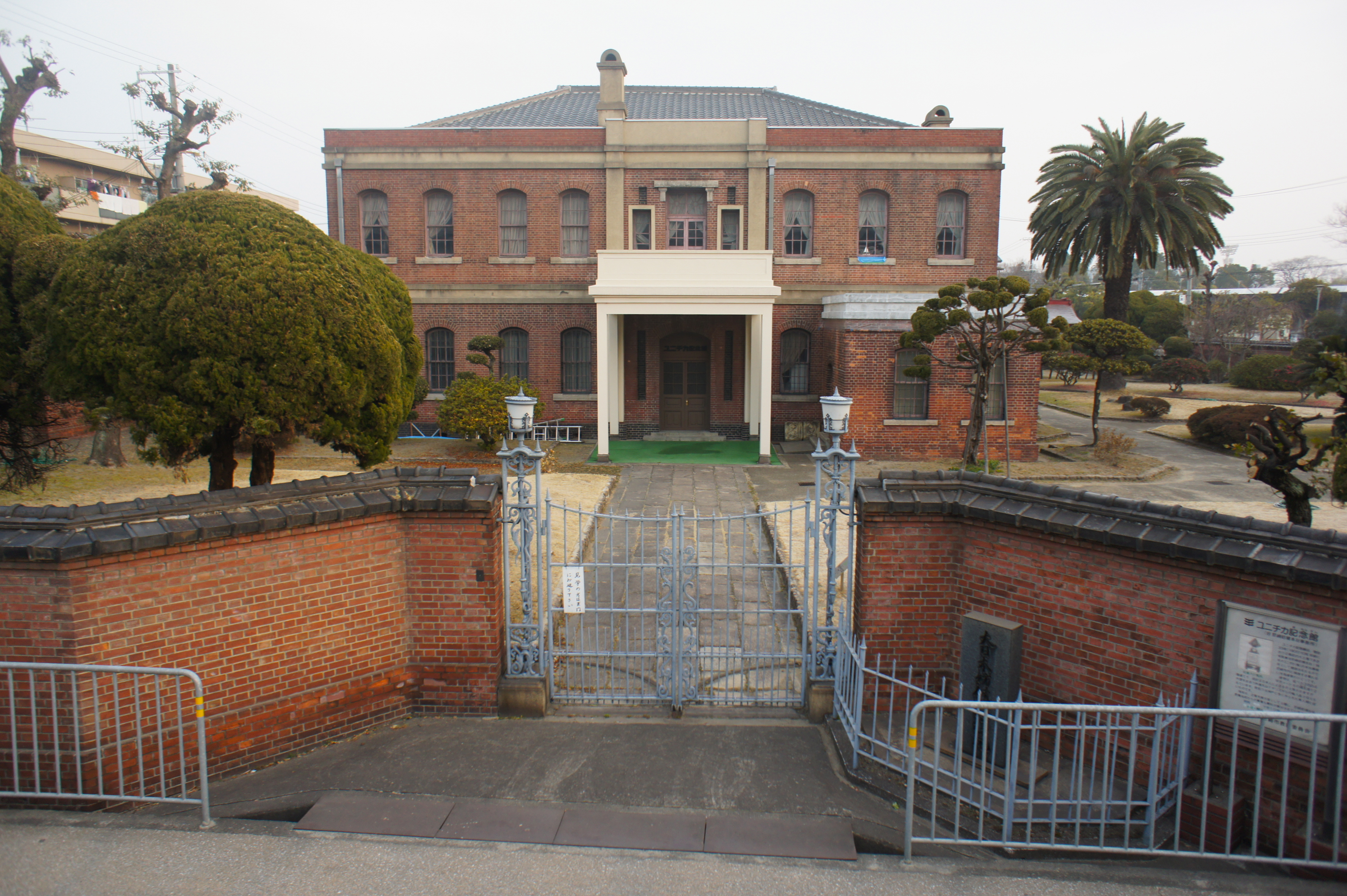
Unitika Memorial Hall in Amagasaki
