= Shakarian =

Shakarian or Shakaryan (Armenian: Շաքարյան) is an Armenian surname. Notable people with the surname include:

- David Shakarian (1914–1984), American businessman
- Demos Shakarian (1913–1993), American businessman
- Paulo Shakarian, American businessman, professor, and author
- Venus Shakarian Toner (1908–1995), American sportswoman and pilot
