= List of The Profit episodes =

The Profit is an American reality television show broadcast on CNBC. On each episode Marcus Lemonis offers struggling small businesses capital investment and his expertise in exchange for an ownership stake in the company. The series premiered on July 30, 2013. The second season premiered on February 25, 2014. The second part of season 2 returned October 2014. After a successful season 2 with ratings going up +115% from last year's first season, the third season premiered Tuesday May 12, 2015.

Businesses submit applications to be visited by Marcus. Marcus meets with the owners, observes the business operations and investigates their financial records. Marcus will then evaluate the company and make an offer to buy a stake in the business over a handshake. Marcus will then assume 100% control to fix the business and make it profitable. This either leads to successful re-launches, or a falling out between Marcus and the owners.

== Series overview ==
Season	Episodes		Originally released	
Season	Episodes		First released	Last released
1	6		July 30, 2013	September 3, 2013
2	18		February 25, 2014	December 16, 2014
3	22		May 12, 2015	February 16, 2016
4	20	11	August 23, 2016	November 29, 2016
4	20	9	June 6, 2017	August 8, 2017
5	18		November 21, 2017	July 31, 2018
6	11		December 4, 2018	March 19, 2019
7	13		November 5, 2019	February 25, 2020
8	8		August 10, 2021	September 28, 2021

== Episodes ==
=== Season 1 ===
No. overall	No. in season	Business	Location	Original release date
1	1	"1 800 Car Cash"	New York City, NY	30 July 2013
Jon and Andrew are struggling to keep their car selling business afloat after the death of their father. Their profits on their cars are too low to cover overhead expenses, their revenue is cut through the use of wholesalers, and Andrew feels restricted by Jon. Marcus offers $200,000 for a third of the business, as well as licensing rights to launch the company to a national brand. Marcus makes changes to the process, getting Jon to appraise the car with the seller in person, and forces him to eliminate the middle-men in the deals to improve profits. Meanwhile, he addresses the tension between Jon and Andrew by giving Andrew the opportunity to create an advertisement without Jon's interference. Marcus invests over $300,000 to remodel the business to give it a new uniform look. Jon pulls through with firmer prices with sellers and making more profit through selling direct to dealers. Andrew impresses Jon with his marketing work. The brothers repair their rift, and the business takes off in the following months, opening stores in several states and attracting new licensees.
2	2	"Jacob Maarse Florists"	Pasadena, CA	6 August 2013
Started by his father, Hank's floral shop has lost money ever since he took over, and is now a disorganised shopfront with inefficient delivery, underpriced flowers, no inventory system and selling a variety of gifts. Marcus offers $100,000 for 25% of the business. Over the week, Marcus invests over $150,000 in renovating the neglected shop and upgrading their delivery vehicles. Marcus also demotes Marina, the general manager. Marcus organises a grand re-opening with the new shop layout, resulting in improved profits and morale, and Marina shines in her new role as retail manager. However, Hank reneges on the deal, claiming that Marcus had not invested anything into the business despite his visible efforts. Furious at Hank's ignorance and childish attitude, Marcus leaves on a note that he fully intends on getting his money back.
3	3	"Planet Popcorn"	Southern California, CA	13 August 2013
With a lucrative contract with Disney, Sharla's company, Planet Popcorn, works several mobile locations at fairs but is unable to turn a profit. Marcus arrives at the company office to find it in disarray. As a cash-only business, the company has no system in place to track the money in the tills, no security at their stores, and piles of money are literally strewn over the floor. Marcus tentatively offers $200,000 for 50% of the business and full financial control. He plans to set up a retail location near a shopping mall, but Sharla pushes for a more remote location. She reveals that she is looking to expand into crepes rather than popcorn, which infuriates Marcus. Sharla is also uncooperative when redesigning the package, and tries to go behind Marcus's back to purchase a domain name owned by Marcus for the business. The deal goes sour when Marcus uncovers over $300,000 unaccounted for in the financial records. Sharla attempts to block Marcus from discussing the finances without her, but Sharla is incapable of understanding the figures. Marcus brings in a forensic accountant, who actually discovers that nearly twice as much money has gone missing from the company. Sharla does not seem alarmed, which causes Marcus to grow concerned and back out of the deal.
4	4	"Eco-Me"	Pomona, CA	20 August 2013
Eco-Me focuses on all-natural cleaning products as an alternative to the artificial chemicals used in most products. Marcus shows some interest in developing the brand further and offers $500,000 for 20% of the business. Marcus is not impressed with the marketing and sales pitch, and the brand fails to attract interest from vendors and focus groups. Criticism is aimed at the misleading "all natural" claim and ambiguous product purpose—the products are named after generic people ("Dave") and are sold as "general purpose cleaners", although they are in fact not appropriate for all purposes. Marcus is disappointed in the long-distance sales manager, who is very passive in making deals, forcing Marcus to sell the product to a hotel chain by cleaning toilets himself. The owner is also very stubborn in changing the name and package design. They manage to compromise with Marcus, and successfully market their product to a vendor.
5	5	"LA Dogworks"	Orange County, CA	27 August 2013
Andrew runs LA Dogworks, a facility for dog owners to receive full service, including boarding, grooming and training. However, Andrew has a very poor understanding of running a business and the kennels have very low occupancy, resulting in very low monthly profits. Marcus tentatively offers $1 million for 50% of the business and full operational control and begins the process of developing private-label products for LA Dogworks. However, his main concern is Andrew's management style. Andrew is highly critical of customers and their needs, responding aggressively to online complaints. He has an even worse regard for his employees, being abusive and regards their complaints as incompetency. In particular, he showed no compassion when one of his employees was bitten, and placed the blame squarely on him. Initially the employees are hopeful of change with Marcus's arrival, but as Andrew's dictatorial demeanor worsens, they begin to leave. Marcus makes little headway after bringing in a psychologist to assess Andrew's interactions in the workplace, revealing that he is a sociopath. A final confrontation between Andrew, his manager and Marcus leaves Marcus in silent anger, and Andrew storms out.
6	6	"Mr. Green Tea"	Keyport, NJ	3 September 2013
Started as a rival line to Häagen-Dazs, Mr. Green Tea sells green tea, ginger and red bean-flavor ice cream to the restaurant business. Unlike previous businesses on the show, Mr. Green Tea is not a failing business, but has reached stagnation. Production is limited by using a co-packer rather than manufacturing their own ice cream, and owner Rich is very conservative in business decisions compared to his son Michael. Michael wishes to invest in a larger facility and estimates a $600,000 cost to get it running. Marcus offers $600,000 for 35% of the business. They acquire the new property and begin working on new product lines for gelato and mochi. However, Rich finds the pace of the change to be too quick and struggles to be decisive. Michael also makes reckless mistakes, purchasing a promotional car without approval and severely underestimating the cost of building out the new warehouse. Despite this, Marcus continues his investment. A month later, they clear out the warehouse and project good growth in the coming years. Marcus then briefly recalls Maarse Florists (Episode 2) to reveal that after the fallout with the owner, he had been repaid by the owner's mother.

=== Season 2 ===
No. overall	No. in season	Business	Location	Original release date
7	1	"Athans Motors"	Morton Grove, IL	25 February 2014
Opened by Pete Athans, Athans Motors is an unsuccessful car sales company with millions in debt, no inventory, no sales and losing over $150,000 a month. Marcus inspects the business and finds that Pete has wasted millions in creating a lounge for visitors to watch movies and play games instead of purchasing cars, of which he only has 20. Furthermore, all the cars are expensive luxury vehicles rather than affordable used cars for the market, forcing general manager Tony to turn away prospective buyers. Having made his fortune in the automotive industry, Marcus offers $3.5 million for 50% of the company. He liquidates all the cars that cannot be sold as well as the lounge amenities to have capital to double their current inventory. He also plans to remodel the site to use the floor space to sell car products and rename the business for a grand opening. Pete, however, is resistant to the change despite his inexperience. His micromanagement frustrates Tony, who resigns. Pete also attempts to walk out of the deal after his business is re-branded to AutoMatch USA, but Marcus soothes his shock and he commits to the re-launch. The grand opening is hindered by heavy snow, but Pete and Marcus successfully host the opening to a busy crowd.
8	2	"A. Stein Meat Products"	Brooklyn, NY	4 March 2014
A 75-year-old business run by Alan and Howard, Stein Meats is a $50,000,000 business selling meats to retailers and restaurants. Although they sell a lot of products, including their Brooklyn Burger brand, they are millions in debt due to not following up on receivables owed to them. Marcus invests $1 million for 50% of the company, and begins the process of chasing up buyers for money owed. However, he is disappointed that the owners and Frank, the general manager, are passive in chasing up receivables, which is what led to them going into debt. Furthermore, the office manager, Donna, is frustrated that Frank does not understand the process to acquire approval for purchases, and threatens to quit. Marcus audits the financials, and is alarmed to find that the business's figures have been under-reported and they owe nearly six times more money than Marcus believed, plus they are two weeks away from bankruptcy and are unable to make the payroll. Marcus backs out of the $1 million deal, but agrees to support the business by investing $200,000 to provide working capital in return for the Brooklyn Burger brand. Marcus then recaps his investment with 1 800 Car Cash (Season 1 Episode 1). The business is turning a healthy profit, has opened a second store location with three more planned. Marcus has then turned the business into a nation-wide model with stores across the country.
9	3	"Michael Sena's Pro-Fit"	Dyer, IN	11 March 2014
Michael Sena, a pioneering personal trainer and author, owns his own training center with his wife, Tina. Pro-Fit offers a highly specialised group training facility, but sees very little activity throughout most of the day. While Marcus is impressed with their passion and training, he sees that expanding the training to incorporate other disciplines, such as yoga and pilates, would sustain the business, which Michael is not in favor of. Marcus offers $50,000 individually to Tina to market a new line of protein bars in return for 50% of the product. Marcus offers $250,000 to Michael for 75% of the gym business, on the condition that they search for a larger site and diversify their services. Marcus connects Tina with a commercial kitchen to produce bite-sized protein bars. However, Michael takes issue with being left out of the process, and fails to get out of his 3-year lease, causing Marcus to walk out of the deal. Humbled by his failure, Michael acts on his own to re-brand the company as "Tina and Michael's Pro-Fit" to make up with his wife. Impressed with this change of character, Marcus offers a smaller investment to get the current site profitable. While Michael disappoints Marcus by changing the floor plan without approval, the business re-opens and takes off with more clients and Tina's protein bites are positively received in trials.
10	4	"Worldwide Trailers"	Tampa, FL	18 March 2014
Owned by Tom and Nancy, Worldwide Trailers manufactures concession trailers, mostly to food truck operators. Marcus is very impressed with the product, but is shocked by the inefficiency. He learns that the trailers are put together in their plant in Georgia, and then sent to Tampa for finishing and sales. A visit to the Georgia site reveals a committed team who are capable of complete the trailers on site, but there is a lack of organisation. Marcus offers $700,000 for 50% of the business. He focuses on moving the business to the Georgia location to cut expenses. He brings in a team to evaluate their inventory, and with everything literally lying around outside and no one responsible, they declare the site to have the worst inventory they have ever seen. The operation is complicated by Nancy's refusal to move from Tampa. The deal falls apart when Nancy and Tim are unable to get over their marital breakup and have an argument in front of Marcus and the employees, forcing Marcus to turn away.
11	5	"Skullduggery"	Anaheim, CA	25 March 2014
Originally started as a fossil replica company, Skullduggery is now owned by brothers Steven and Peter and produces traditional toys. The company is running at a loss, and Marcus offers to invest $1.1 million to pay off the debt, plus another $1 million for working capital, for 50% of the business. Steven and Peter walk out on Marcus and afterwards demand that he only get 30%. Marcus agrees on the condition that he receives full financial control. Disappointed that the company does not do any market research for their products, Marcus organises a focus group with kids and parents. The MaxTrax light-up cars are a favourite, while the AeroFlix is confusing, despite being a significant investment. The parents report that they believe the products are not unique enough to draw attention, which Steven takes very poorly. Marcus clears out their useless inventory to gain some funds, which the owners protest again, and they are also reluctant to invest in making more efficient molds in the factory. Marcus invests in developing a creative lab and purchases a 3D printer. However, his meeting with NASCAR turns sour when Steven and Peter outright refuse to work with them. After development on the NASCAR product stalls, Steven, Peter and their father try to re-negotiate the deal, taking issue with Marcus controlling the financials. With the deal points no longer agreed on, Marcus cuts his losses and leaves.
12	6	"Sweet Pete's"	Jacksonville, FL	1 April 2014
Run by eccentric candymaker Peter and wife Alison, Sweet Pete's is a popular candy store that offers classes for children to learn to make candy. The business is crippled by their location, a residential area with a domestic kitchen. Despite this, their passion keeps them working around the clock to fulfill a bulk order, with Marcus coming in to lend a hand. Their expansion opportunities are ruled out by their business partner Dane, who provided them with the property and invested $2000 in cash. Despite Peter's demands, Dane refuses to sell his part of the company and Peter and Alison are living off $10,000 a year from their share. Marcus offers $750,000 for 50% of the business. Dane refuses to relinquish his shares despite Marcus's offer to return his $2000 investment plus interest. Marcus helps Peter set up an online service, rents a commercial kitchen space, hires more staff and scouts for a new prime location. Dane tries to negotiate a new deal, feeling that he is not being valued for his contribution, and demands $150,000 for his shares. Insulted by the inflated figure, Marcus reads through the shareholder agreement, and Peter is confronted with the option of abandoning the name and recipes to start fresh. Instead, Marcus uncovers a clause which determines stock dilution. He confronts Dane and tells him that Peter and Alison will be loaned money to invest into the business, which will dilute Dane's shares unless he matches the investment. Unable to match this proposition, Dane leaves the business, paving the way for Peter and Alison to expand their Sweet Pete's brand. With the new store being built, Marcus gives them a mobile candy store. Sweet Pete's would go on to meet huge success and be featured several times in later episodes.
13	7	"Amazing Grapes"	Orange County, CA	8 April 2014
In a classic case of absent owners, Amazing Grapes is mostly run by the staff and focuses on selling wine and beer. However, their most profitable aspect, the bar and restaurant, is poorly sited in the building and has minimal floor space for their margins, while the space is filled with inventory that cannot be sold. The staff are very knowledgeable and experienced, but are overruled by the owners when they do turn up to manage. Marcus offers $300,000 for 51% of the business, with 25% going to the staff. Marcus remodels the store to give more floor space to the bar and restaurant, moving the display shelves to illuminated sides. Although met with initial resistance, Marcus is pleased at the relaunch.
14	8	"Key West Key Lime Pie Co."	Key West, FL	15 April 2014
Owned by Jim and Alison, the Key West Key Lime Co. is riding on the success of being the "Nation's Best Pie", with high revenue for their product. However, they are not turning a profit. Marcus finds that they have two locations: their main store and a shipping office, which is losing money. He is also disappointed to find that their signature pies use pre-made crusts and powdered ingredients to speed up the process. Marcus invests $450,000 for 51% of the business, on the condition that they do not sell what they do not make, and that development is focused on creating a proprietary pie. Marcus closes down the unprofitable shipping office and clears out all non-company items in the store, much to Jim's ire. Jim is even more resistant to changing the recipe after Marcus hires three pastry chefs to create new recipes. The staff reveal that Jim's original crust was the best, which Marcus is surprised to hear after Jim's reliance on pre-made crusts. Jim perfects the recipe and the shop is renovated to more prominently display the pies and the baking process. Marcus rewards manager Tami, who is pregnant and working two jobs, by giving her a pay rise and maternal pay. The store reopens successfully, but Jim has a hard time coping with the change.
15	9	"Courage.b"	Greenwich, CT	14 October 2014
A clothing line started by Noemi and managed by son Nicolas, Courage.b met initial success but has run into difficult times in the changing economy. Marcus invests $800,000 for 30% of the business. Marcus has to throw out their useless inventory, a result of Noemi's unsuccessful ideas. Instead, Marcus focuses on building "five pillars" based on their main product and establishes a distinct, consistent look. During the process, Nicolas is abusive to his mother, and Marcus manages to get him to open up, revealing a control streak and sense of mistrust. The team works together to remodel the store, turning it into a high-class establishment.
16	10	"Artistic Stitch"	Queens, NY	21 October 2014
Originally a successful embroidery company, Artistic Stitch was expanded by owner Sal into a mini-mall, including baseball pens, a basketball court, and an Italian restaurant. As a result of this spending, Sal has accumulated significant debt. Wanting to close most of the unnecessary businesses and focus on the embroidery, Marcus offers $660,000 for 50% of the business and full financial control. Marcus sets up a new DIY printing station and renames the establishment "Queen's Vibe". He discovers that the sales manager Nick has made minimal effort to market their services, having only put in ads in the Yellow Pages and not having contracts with any major businesses. Marcus tests Nick's sales pitch by taking him out to the local fire station, where Nick is unable to deliver a clear pitch. Marcus takes over and they secure a deal. As a result, Marcus changes Nick's payment from a salary to a 100% commission plan, which Nick accepts. Meanwhile, Marcus uncovers erratic spending on the company credit card by Sal, and pending legal action from the landlord due to unpaid rent and operating without a certificate. Unable to trust Sal, Marcus cuts his losses and walks out on the deal.
17	11	"Swanson's Fish Market"	Fairfield, CT	28 October 2014
Run by Gary, Swanson's Fish Market has been crippled by a fire that destroyed their historic store building, and a separate fire that gutted their warehouse. Marcus finds the business to be unappealing, but the customers praise the prepared foods, such as fish soup, sold in limited numbers. Marcus offers $1 million for the building with 0% stake in the company, with the option for the owners to buy it back. Marcus reorganises the store to display high-margin fish more prominently and focuses on the prepared foods. The building's co-tenant, a café, is folded into the Swanson business when they are unable to pay their overdue rent, allowing Swanson to make and sell more of their food products. With the investment money, the company is able to remove some of their debt to vendors. However, Marcus is very critical of the luxurious lifestyle of the owners, including driving a BMW, owning a boat and renovating their house, despite their struggling business. Finally, Marcus becomes furious when he investigates the property documents and realises that the process for foreclosure began before Marcus arrived. Furious at their dishonesty, Marcus storms out of the deal.
18	12	"Unique Salon & Spa"	Long Island, NY	4 November 2014
A specialised hair salon owned by Carolyn, Unique has several store locations and her primary location has become neglected. A breakup with her former partner has left the business in turmoil, and to carry her through, Carolyn sells a range of beauty products in her store. The main revenue earner is their colour bar. However, they lack an inventory system, resulting in a loss of customers and significant losses in waste. Marcus invests $250,000 for 20% of the business, while also pushing Carolyn's Unique product label and claiming 51%. Marcus eliminates all brands from the store apart from Unique, which he repackages for better appearance. Using the names of Carolyn's children, they rename the brand “Erika Cole by Racquel”. The salon is renovated and their ineffective general manager is removed, giving Carolyn a direct line to her store managers. With the store remodelled and the new inventory system put into place, Unique reopens and is very successful.
19	13	"West End Coffee Company"	Greenville, SC	11 November 2014
West End Coffee is run by Rebecca and John, a divorced couple. The company roasts coffee and sells it wholesale, however they have very limited operating capacity. Marcus offers $200,000 for 51% of the business. While they initially agree, Marcus realises that their divorce has caused a stalemate in their relationships. Rebecca is fearful of John firing her from the company, but John invested his retirement fund, controlled by Rebecca, into the business. This accidental arrangement makes John feel like a hostage, and their bickering has caused a collapse in communication within the company. Marcus mediates the dispute and persuades Rebecca to relinquish her control of John's fund, and he sets the pair up to meet with a local restaurant for a partnership. Marcus returns a week later to find that the deal they made has stalled, and the two have returned to their argumentative past. Unable to work with them, Marcus leaves the deal.
20	14	"Coopersburg Sports"	Coopersburg, PA	18 November 2014
Owned by Scott, Coopersburg Sports holds a prestigious MLB license and produces mini-baseball bats. Having previously turned around his father's tool-turning business into the sports industry, Scott is struggling to modernise. His workshop is poorly designed with no flow and poor inventory tracking, and he is losing business. Marcus negotiates $630,000 for 30% of the business and 3% royalty. Marcus meets with MLB and discovers that Coopersburg Sports does not have the reach it claims it has, with the number of stadiums in which their products are sold diminishing. Scott is extremely reluctant to diversify his product range outside of baseball bats, but Marcus persuades him to allow his children to take over the creative process. They develop a new line of wooden products, including stools, branded kitchenware and accessories using the machinery they already have. They successfully market a number of their new products to Bass Pro Shops.
21	15	"Shuler's Bar-B-Que"	Latta, SC	25 November 2014
Run by husband and wife Norton and Lynn, Shuler's is a very popular all-you-can-eat buffet with exceptional barbecued meats and famous biscuits. However, high food costs, insufficient space and congested lines is affecting their profits. Marcus invests $500,000 for 40% of the business. Marcus plans on renovating the restaurant to expand seating and improve the point-of-sale counter. He also plans to create a brand out of Lynn's biscuits and set up a general store on site. Lynn is initially opposed to modifying the recipe for mass production, but understands the purpose and relents. Her brother-in-law, Ewell, is an ambiguous part of the process. He wishes to have a bigger cut in the business, but evades Marcus when offered the restaurant manager position. Instead, Ewell is fixated on marketing the restaurant and working through social media, which Marcus does not believe is currently needed as the restaurant is already highly successful. Ewell suddenly goes home, having sent a vague message indicating that he is not needed. With Ewell out of the way and cheaper local produce secured, the restaurant re-opens and the expanded seating caters to a very large crowd.
22	16	"ASL Sign Sales & Service"	Surfside Beach, SC	2 December 2014
ASL Signs is run by Anthony, a young and ambitious owner who wants to spread his sign business to a state and national level. The business manufactures and sets up signs of all sorts. Marcus soon discovers that Anthony is not really in need of an investment partnership, but wants Marcus for his business contacts. Marcus finds the showroom to be a chaotic collection of signs, which the team cleans up. When a nearby hotel visits to get their sign repaired, Marcus is disappointed when Anthony fails to take the opportunity to visit the hotel in person and defers it to the next day. Marcus also begins to see Anthony's aggressive and dominating attitude. Anthony makes arbitrary changes to designs made by his project manager, Josh, using fancier but less practical fonts. When Josh and Anthony visit the hotel, Anthony overrules Josh's expertise by claiming impossibly short delivery times, confusing the buyer. He also berates Marcus for being late, despite having no obligation to be present. Marcus is then contacted by a local business owner, who shares Anthony's negative reputation in town, having been sued over a disagreement regarding an improper sign. Marcus, not interested in getting involved, leaves the business. Uniquely, this episode is the only one in which Marcus does not even make an offer. Marcus also revisits Planet Popcorn (Season 1 Episode 3). After the original episode's airing, Planet Popcorn lost its lucrative contract with Disney. Sharla followed Marcus's advice and made numerous changes, including tidying up the cash mess and implementing an inventory system. She meets with Marcus, who is impressed enough to make a new offer of $20,000 for 40% of the company and royalty.
23	17	"My Big Fat Greek Gyro"	McMurray, PA	9 December 2014
My Big Fat Geek Gyro is a family-run franchise specialising in Greek fast food. Marcus, himself adopted by a Greek family, is excited at engaging in cultural delights, but is disappointed to find that the restaurant exclusively serves outsourced frozen food, as well as numerous non-Greek items on the menu, including tater tots and hummus (which Marcus, being of Lebanese background, pokes fun at). Marcus also learns that the franchisees have received no support from the owner, Mike, and lack any consistency. Marcus offers $350,000 for 55% of the business. Marcus uses the unsuccessful Mt. Lebanon location to model the new concept, a fresh Greek food bar giving customers the option of customising their meal, and rebranding it "The Simple Greek". Despite some reservations, the staff approve of the concept and the restaurant is renovated and successfully re-opened.
24	18	"A Progress Report"	TBA	16 December 2014
After recapping the deal with Sweet Pete's (Season 2 Episode 6), Marcus discusses the purchase of a historic mansion in Jacksonville, FL, which he purchased for $500,000 and spent $2.3 million renovating, turning it into an industrial kitchen with plenty of floor space for candy, function halls, a restaurant and numerous classrooms for their education program. Online profits are up from $15,000 a month to $100,000 a week. Marcus then reflects on his method of using trust in his business, and mentions Jacob Maarse Florists (Season 1 Episode 2) as an example of how it backfires. The episode ended with Hank Maarse breaking the deal and taking Marcus's $150,000 investment. Marcus mentions that Hank's mother contacted him and sent him a check for $150,000, allowing Marcus to recover the cost. He contrasts this experience with Skullduggery (Season 2 Episode 5), in which he lost a significant amount of money. Marcus then reflects on 1 800 Car Cash (Season 1 Episode 1) and how it has turned into a million-dollar company. He also brings up Athans Motors (Season 2 Episode 1) and their success, including their partnership with 1 800 Car Cash. Michael Sena's Pro-Fit (Season 2 Episode 3) has seen the owners improve their marriage and successfully market Tina's Pro-Fit bar at GNC. Worldwide Trailers (Season 2 Episode 4), despite not doing a deal with Marcus due to the owners' marital problems, has taken on Marcus's advice. Nancy has moved away from Florida to consolidate their business in Georgia, implemented an inventory system and has improved relations with co-owner Tom. A. Stein Meats (Season 2 Episode 2) lost their business. At the end of the episode, Marcus offered $200,000 to cover the payroll in return for their Brooklyn Burger brand. While they took the money, they did not give Brooklyn Burger to Marcus, and instead they are locked in a lawsuit. Mr. Green Tea (Season 1 Episode 6) has set up their new manufacturing plant, has their brand in grocery stores worldwide and produces ice cream for Marcus-owned bakery Crumbs.

=== Season 3 ===
No. overall	No. in season	Business	Location	Original release date
25	1	"SJC Drums"	Southbridge, MA	12 May 2015
SJC is a drum manufacturing company started by brothers Mike and Scott producing custom drum kits. The company began to fail after the brothers fell out and Mike bought out Scott's share of the company. Marcus offers $400,000 for 33% of the business, with another 33% going to manager Chris. Marcus identifies their flawed process through the cluttered inventory and lack of tracking, so he sets up the "10 steps to success", clearing the work space and setting up work stations for a product to go through. With the custom drum kits too expensive for the mass market, Marcus pushes the "Good, Better, Best" concept and tasks the team with developing a cheaper drum kit for beginners. The team are unable find out how to cut costs, so Marcus decides to bring Scott back. The brothers initially have trouble resolving their past issues, but they are able to work together. Scott's exceptional insight into drum design allows them to produce a quality drum at a fraction of the cost, which they test in a sound studio. Mike then markets the drum kit to Sam Ash Music, who is impressed with their local story and connections to Green Day and Slipknot, standing them in favour compared to multinational manufacturers.
26	2	"Progress Reports"	TBA	19 May 2015
Coopersburg Sports (Season 2 Episode 14) has completed their new production plant with impressive flow and organisation, in turn improving revenue. However, Scott has spent $85,000 on a new printer to create stadium-themed tiles, for which he has low margins and no orders. Despite the disappointing purchase, Marcus is willing to invest another $150,000 to help Scott's business, especially after seeing the partnerships and orders with Bass Pro Shops, NASCAR and Walmart. Marcus visits Carolyn in her Unique Hair Salon (Season 2 Episode 12). While having his hair cut by Carolyn, they discuss the success the company has achieved. When Marcus learns that Carolyn has not been taking her paycheck regularly, he praises her work ethic and demands that she pay herself properly, bringing her to tears. Returning to Artistic Stitch (Season 2 Episode 10), Marcus finds that Sal and Nick have drawn a salary without his approval and have not paid rent, causing Marcus to cut ties. Marcus returns under the guise of delivering tax forms to Sal, only to find Sal absent and all of his changes have been reverted. Furthermore, Sal sold Marcus's $27,000 printer. Marcus returns a week later and confronts Sal, who admits to taking the investment money to pay for his own expenses. His landlord is about to begin the eviction process, causing an argument with the staff who are concerned about losing their jobs. With the business likely to shut down, Marcus parts ways with Sal for good. Marcus returns to Key West Key Lime Pie Co. (Season 2 Episode 8). He finds that Jim has decided to move on while Tami is in full control of day-to-day operations. She has introduced new flavours other than their original key lime, including mango, blood orange and blueberry, which are very popular. Marcus takes Tami to the bar where she used to work, and offers her 25% of the business.
27	3	"Tonnie's Minis"	New York City, NY	26 May 2015
Specialising in miniature cupcakes, Tonnie's Minis has come on hard times after owner Tonnie made a series of poor decisions in expanding too aggressively. His unique concept is the build-your-own-cupcake. However, this turns out to be a few toppings behind the counter. Heavily in debt, Tonnie has borrowed money off his wife and family, and is in trouble with a loan shark. Marcus is skeptical, but offers $100,000 for 20% of the business, far short of Tonnie's anticipated $600,000 for 33%. Tonnie's ambition outweighs his business sense, and Marcus is disappointed to find that despite his debt, Tonnie has already negotiated a lease for a site in Newark before he has stabilised his original store. Marcus focuses on renovating the store to provide a more attractive storefront and making the build-your-own-cupcake concept central to the layout.
28	4	"Standard Burger"	Staten Island, NY	2 June 2015
Standard Burger was envisioned as a restaurant chain created by a group of five friends. After accumulating large debts, co-owner Sammy emailed Marcus incessantly until Marcus finally met with them. Marcus is disappointed to find that Standard Burger did not set the standard and was, in his mind, rather average. The cause is revealed to be due to the kitchen standards slipping and using frozen meat. Marcus learns that Sammy's brother, Fuji, was the only one with restaurant experience but was ousted from the group. Marcus arranges a deal to invest $130,000 into the business plus $15,000 for each owner for 30% of the business, on the condition that Fuji is invited back and given 10%. With no regular manager, Joe assumes responsibility and Fuji heads the kitchen. They develop a new menu with quality ingredients, and remodel the restaurant to focus on the burgers as well as setting up bars for shakes and baked potatoes. The concept is highly successful and the company begins considering expansion.
29	5	"Fuelfood"	West Palm Beach, FL	16 June 2015
Owned by Erik, Fuelfood is a line of home-delivered meals aimed at assisting clients in losing weight. Many of the staff were recruited from the program, having positive experiences. Marcus visits Erik and finds that while the product line had a good market, there was a low customer retention rate. Marcus offers $300,000 for 51% of the company, which Erik accepts, but Marcus does not complete the transaction until he receives written agreement from the other investors. In the meantime, Marcus discovers that the kitchen is under-equipped. Erik's strategy is heavily marketed towards the wrong audience and, during the focus group session, receives negative comments regarding the appearance of the food and an offensive advertisement. Erik's aggressive management style becomes evident, often speaking abusively to his employees even after an open feedback session. Marcus invests $10,000 in new kitchen equipment, which Erik ignores. Marcus discovers that many staff have left the business due to pay cuts, as Erik has not obtained agreement from the other shareholders and thus has not received the investment money. Marcus does an internet search for the missing partner and is shocked to find that he has been arrested for involvement in a Ponzi scheme and the shares are in receivership. Frightened by the Ponzi scheme and deterred by Erik's aggressive denial, he walks out on the deal.
30	6	"Grafton Furniture"	Miami, FL	23 June 2015
Grafton Furniture is a third-generation company started by Esteban, currently managed by Steve and to be handed down to Steven. While the company was doing well financially with its high-end custom furniture, Marcus decides to expand the clientele by making non-custom items. He offers $1.5 million for 45% of the business and 100% say on Steven's development in the company after finding that his father Steve has been too hesitant to let go of control. Marcus invests in more modern equipment and a new warehouse, which Steve is initially opposed to. Marcus is also disappointed in the rushed process, with many items suffering from manufacturing faults. To open the company's customer base, he tasks them with designing a series of four different chairs based on the "American Dream", inspired by Esteban's success story and his care for his employees, many of whom are immigrants. These chairs were successfully marketed to DirectBuy.
31	7	"Precise Graphix"	Emmaus, PA	30 June 2015
Precise Graphix was founded by brothers Keith and Dean. They specialise in producing signs and brand development for businesses. Despite a large workshop capacity, their equipment is severely outdated, including transferring data using floppy disks. Marcus offers $270,000 for 33% of the company, but wants the company to prove their worth by fulfilling a special order: rebrand one of Marcus's Camping World stores. While their ideas are creative, their lack of clear management results in rushed production and numerous manufacturing flaws, and the branding is incomplete, disappointing Marcus. After the roles are clearly distinguished, the company is given a second chance to remodel an AutoMatch store (owned by Marcus and previously featured on The Profit). This time, their design and installation is flawless, greatly impressing Marcus and securing the deal.
32	8	"The Lano Company"	Kansas City, MO	7 July 2015
After creating a lip balm based on lanolin, Miranda was inspired to design more products. However, she lost her way after developing a myriad of beauty products with no clear concept, including light-up tweezers and a lip balm with a mirror and LED light. Marcus is interested in the concept of a lanolin-based line of products, and they agree on Marcus investing $500,000 for 20% of the business and a share of the profits. After Miranda unsuccessfully markets her eclectic products, Marcus outsources the manufacturing and product development and consolidates the brand into one line: Pure Lano. After the design inadvertently put together a swastika-like logo, Marcus settles on a cleaner design and packaging, and Miranda successfully markets her products, including an improved light-on lip balm.
33	9	"A Progress Report #3"	TBA	14 July 2015
Sweet Pete's continues its stellar rise in the confectionery industry, becoming a highly profitable Florida attraction. Marcus, Pete and Alison attend a confectionery convention, where Pete is instantly recognised and praised. Marcus helps Pete get his product into a hotel service and a spot in EverBank Field. Marcus also invests in a property that has opened up beside the downtown Jacksonville store. Revisiting 1 800 Car Cash (Season 1 Episode 1), the business has multiple branches around the country. However, the original store is about to be closed by the landlord exercising an old clause without explanation. Forced to move away from the historic site where their father built the company, the owners scout out a more favourable site along the highway. Returning to Courage.b (Season 2 Episode 9), Marcus finds that Nicolas has taken matter into his own hands and introduced more items outside of the "five pillars" Marcus established. Despite renting warehouse space for their inventory, Nicolas has continued to hoard the inventory in their main office, creating a bottleneck in supply. Marcus walks out on Nicolas when he is unable to explain himself, but Nicolas regains Marcus's trust when he opens up about his insecurities over the success he has been having. Marcus helps Nicolas clear out years of mistakes in the warehouse once and for all, and attends the opening of a new Courage.b store.
34	10	"Bentley's Corner Barkery"	Chicago, IL	28 October 2015
Lisa and Giovanni run Bentley's Corner Barkery, a pet supply store specialising in all-natural products. They have opened numerous locations, but lack a clear uniform concept, and they are in the process of acquiring another pet store chain despite being low in funds. Furthermore, the store managers are disappointed in the lack of support and communication with the owners. Marcus offers $1.7 million in two checks: $400,000 equity and $1.3 million to fund the acquisition. Marcus claims 40% of the company, to drop to 25% upon repayment of the $1.3 million. Marcus remodels the store to improve layout and put high-margin products up front. Lisa is reluctant to improve the inventory and refuses to stock cheaper products made by companies who also produce non-natural product lines. Marcus is frustrated by Lisa's double standards, but Lisa and Giovanni see the error of their judgement when they visit pet food manufacturer Pet Fresh. After the renovation is complete, the store re-opens successfully.
35	11	"Blues Jean Bar"	San Francisco, CA	10 November 2015
Blues Jean Bar, owned by Lady and based on her New Orleans background, sells denim jeans and has stores in San Francisco, Chicago and Dallas. The main attraction is the "jeans bar", where staff can assess a customer's needs and pick the right jeans without the customer touching the product. When Marcus tries the process, he is disappointed at the inefficiency and lack of inventory, which is turning customers away. The company is in trouble due to Lady's aggressive expansion, which has forced her to close most her stores and keep the only three profitable ones, and even then has not visited them in person since opening. Marcus and Lady agree on a $900,000 deal with Marcus receiving 50% ownership. Marcus discards most of the useless inventory and focuses on building a new chain using the Chicago store as a model. He focuses on selling related clothing and accessories with high margins to complement jeans, and re-brands the store as Denim & Soul. The store has a successful launch and Lady is strongly behind pushing the new brand and concept.
36	12	"Kensington Garden Rooms"	Hilmar, CA	17 November 2015
Damian and Simon, both from England, manufacture custom gazebos. While the product is very impressive, Marcus is disappointed by their location, a disorganised workshop located on an almond farm, and the breakdown in communication. Furthermore, their main product is far too expensive for most customers, resulting in low turn-around. Marcus negotiates with Simon, Damian and investor Kab for $150,000 for 12% of the company, with another 10% going to staff member Jack. Marcus is impressed when Simon and Damian organised their cluttered mess and seek out a new site for the workshop. Kab tries to renege on the agreement and wants Marcus to buy him out. Marcus offers $250,000, but furiously falls back to the original deal when Kab tries to claim more money for his son's involvement. The company is tasked to design a cheaper gazebo for True Value. Simon has to leave for England to be with his family, and in his absence Damian completes an unsatisfactory gazebo. The pair overcome their misgivings and work to produce a gazebo that is displayed at True Value.
37	13	"Da Lobsta / Betty's Pie Whole"	Chicago, IL / Encinitas, CA	24 November 2015
In this episode, Marcus works with two different businesses. The first, Da Lobsta, is owned by J and specialises in lobster takeaway food. J owns two store locations and a food truck. J has run into large debt and reached out to Marcus. Marcus is impressed with the product, but upon investigating the company financials, is severely disappointed with J's management. Not only has J relied on his family to providing funding without investing a single dollar himself, J continues to maintain an expensive lifestyle. Marcus does not trust J, and offers $210,000 for 51% of the business, full financial control and a salary for J. J is reluctant to give up control of the company and the deal does not go through. Marcus sums up Da Lobsta as an undeserving business, and then refers to Betty's Pie Whole. Owner Betty has overextended herself in opening two stores, and to complicate matters, the second store, Elizabethan Desserts, is completely different to her pie store. Marcus offers $75,000 for 25% of the business. Marcus identifies the kitchen to be the weak link in the process, and invests in new equipment to improve output, since the store is usually sold out of pies early in the day. He is also critical of Betty's reluctance to write down her recipes, which causes a bottleneck in the process, and her stubbornness in making their own ice cream. More importantly, he convinces Betty of the need to close down Elizabethan Desserts to cut losses and focus on the pie shop. When Marcus returns, the kitchen is running smoothly and Betty has organised her recipes and has outsourced the ice cream. This is the only episode in which two different businesses were featured.
38	14	"Return to Standard Burger"	Staten Island, NY	1 December 2015
Since their successful relaunch, business at Standard Burger has improved and they won the local Battle of the Burger. However, profits are down and Marcus returns to find the restaurant in disarray. Handwritten boards promote a cheaper-option "Regular Burger". Marcus is baffled by the concept, which is driving customers to buy the cheaper product and further declining company sales. Marcus organises a meeting with a potential franchisee, who suggests that the food margins must be lowered and non-burger items be added to the menu. Marcus handles the cost of the meat by simply asking the vendor, and introduces an oversized hot dog and regular-sized junior dog to the menu. Meanwhile, the tension between Joe and Sammy reaches a climax, and Joe is discovered to have had an affair with a former employee, causing a rift between the restaurant and the staff and customers. Marcus removes Joe from the manager position and Sammy takes over temporarily. The restaurant successfully launches its new menu and secures the franchise agreement, and the owners are again on good terms.
39	15	"Wick'ed"	Burbank, CA	8 December 2015
Run by Mark Biren and wife Samantha, Wick'ed produces candles. Although creative for a niche market, they have struggled to find distributors and their output is limited. Marcus offers $200,000 for 33% of the business. While Samantha is receptive of Marcus's suggestions, Mark has difficult accepting criticism. Mark clings onto the idea of each candle having a story, but a visit to the local candle shop reveals the reality that customers pick only by look and smell. Furthermore, Mark has a tendency to hold grudges, refusing to work with a candle manufacturer due to an error made years ago. Mark is persuaded to work with the manufacturer, and Marcus provides creative input into the box design. Mark reveals that his mistrust stems from a broken family. The company is renamed Biren & Co. and the business successfully promotes their new line of scented products.
40	16	"KOTA Longboards"	Denver, CO	15 December 2015
Run by former Navy pilot Mike, KOTA Longboards (inspired by the acronym "Knights of the Air") produces custom longboards. The longboards have very high quality and finish, and the workers are highly skilled, leading Marcus to offer $300,000 for 40% of the business, on the condition that the key staff also gain a small percentage of his shares. Marcus learns that Mike has been making the product for a non-existent market—Mike avoids the competition by making boards for the 30-50 age group, pricing the boards at $329 based on the cost of manufacturing rather than the market. Marcus takes Mike to visit Rob Dyrdek, who is impressed by the board but also baffled by Mike's target audience. Marcus urges Mike to design shortboards more appropriate for the younger market. When Marcus returns, he is shocked to find that staff have been leaving. Mike wishes to renegotiate the staff's share of the deal, which Marcus rebukes by claiming more for himself. Mike's arrogance and continual loss of employees leads Marcus to back out of the deal.
41	17	"Vision Quest"	Ronkonkoma, NY	5 January 2016
Vision Quest is a company specialising in lighting and owned by Larry. The business stands out in that it designs and manufactures their lighting products. Marcus offers $375,000 for 50% of the business. While he is impressed with the product, the company has been poorly managed due to a lack of structure. Furthermore, Larry has been hoarding failed projects, artificially inflating the value of the company. Larry has an opportunity to prove himself by producing custom lighting for a local hospital. However, he embarrasses himself and an associate company when a mistake in the inventory forces him to delay the product. Larry gets a second chance to prove himself when Marcus invites him to a new Sweet Pete's store in need of new lighting before their grand opening. Larry completes the design and installation only a minute before the opening. Marcus is greatly impressed with the work and concludes the deal.
42	18	"Inkkas Global Footwear"	Brooklyn, NY	19 January 2016
Owned by two brothers and their best friend, manufactures shoes with unique patterns and fabrics inspired by designs from around the world. Marcus arrives at their location to find that the business is pulling in some revenue as a wholesaler, but are losing money as a retailer. Additionally, CEO Dan Ben-Nun has a dominating presence in the business, with his spending on developing unpopular items left unchecked. Marcus offers $750,000 for 51% of the business. He sets to work on closing down their unsuccessful retail front and moves them to one of his offices in the heart of the art and fashion district. He then sets a clear design template of focusing on five different kinds of shoes with designs based on four global regions. Dan, however, is too unfocused and tries too hard to impress Marcus instead of following instructions, investing too much time and money into purchasing excessive materials and ordering numerous shoes. Once Dan is able to control his creative urges, he successfully markets his new line of shoes and they hold a launch event.
43	19	"240sweet"	Columbus, IN	26 January 2016
Run by couple Alexa and Sam, 240sweet manufactures artisan marshmallows. However, their production is seriously hampered due to an ambiguous arrangement with Alexa's father, Max, whose condiment-manufacturing business takes up 90% of the floor space and contaminates the marshmallows with spices. Marcus offers $100,000 for 46% of the company, with 10% going to dedicated accountant Dede and the remainder going to Alexa and Sam, on the condition that they talk with Max about moving out. Marcus brings Sam and Alexa out to a farmer's market to determine their most popular flavours, and discover that Alexa's best-selling salted caramel is particularly underwhelming. Marcus brings in Pete Beringer (Sweet Pete's, Season 2) to consult, but Sam and Alexa are outwardly hostile to working with Pete. Back at the warehouse, a water pipe bursts, causing flooding, and Sam and Alexa have not spoken to Max about moving. Feeling that he is being used to mediate the discussion, Marcus gets Max to agree to move out. Marcus returns weeks later to find that Max has moved into a cheaper and larger facility and is happy with the new space. However, he meets with Dede to find that she has been ousted from the company. She confesses that Sam and Alexa used her cancer survival story to gain leverage with Marcus to get the deal. Marcus confronts the two owners. Sam shows an aggressive streak, having demanded that Dede contribute financially despite there being no condition requiring her to do so. Marcus concludes that Sam and Alexa had no intention of doing business with him, and only applied for the show to get Max out and for publicity.
44	20	"Farmgirl Flowers"	San Francisco, CA	2 February 2016
Owned by Christina, Farmgirl Flowers is a growing e-commerce business focusing on delivering flower arrangements. Marcus is impressed with the business model, focusing on a single-choice daily flower arrangement, allowing the business to reduce costs and minimise waste. However, despite planning an expansion to nation-wide delivery, their logistics and online interface are not up to scratch. Christina is concerned that her competitors will beat her, and believes that her failure to raise capital is because of her gender. While reasonably confident in their growth, Marcus has reservations about how much value Christina thinks he brings to the business. Christina demands an investment of $1 million for 5% of the business, which leaves Marcus speechless. Marcus counters with $1 million for 25%. Christina is unwilling to go over 10%. Marcus does not agree to the deal, citing that the small stake gives him little personal interest in the business. Marcus then recaps and revisits his investment with The Simple Greek (formerly My Big Fat Greek Gyro, Season 2). The rebranded Greek fast-food restaurant has turned out to be successful and they are receiving numerous franchisee applications. However, all is not well, as owner Mike has not been actively contributing to the business and Marcus has not been receiving any return on his investment of $400,000 in re-launching the brand. Marcus has planned an expansion to Chicago and Mike's son Andreas is sent there to take charge. However, Marcus is severely disappointed that Mike was late to the grand opening, and challenges his integrity, offering to buy him out if he didn't care. On top of that, Marcus has had to hire an adviser to fill the role Mike did not take. Mike insists that he is willing to stay with the business in the long term. Marcus introduces Greek yogurt to the menu to increase profits throughout the day, and he helps Andreas and his parents see eye-to-eye.
45	21	"Growing Pains at Mr. Green Tea"	Keyport, NJ	9 February 2016
Marcus returns to Mr. Green Tea (Season 1). Their revenue has nearly doubled since their new production plant began. However, there are problems between owner Rich and his son and vice-president, Michael. Michael wishes to have equity in the business, but his cavalier attitude does not impress the conservative Rich. Marcus finds that Michael has introduced several new ice cream flavours, but has not done any market research. Marcus is particularly unimpressed with the black sesame flavour, as well as Michael's lack of understanding of the cost of his failures. Marcus tries to coach Michael into become a better leader. They go to a supermarket to get feedback on the new flavours, with fortune cookie and chai latte being popular, and black sesame receiving negative feedback. They also find that the prominent company name misleads people into thinking green tea was in every flavour. Marcus instructs Michael to change the package design, which leads to an argument. Eager to support Michael's development, Marcus brings the team to their cream supplier, where Michael is able to secure a lower cost per gallon for a larger order. Rich develops a new flavour based on spicy mango. They visit a Mexican restaurant that currently only sells their vanilla ice cream, but after overwhelmingly positive feedback, they accept the new flavour. Michael pulls through with the redesigned packaging. As a final challenge, Marcus arranges a meeting with frozen yogurt chain 16 Handles. Although 16 Handles have never out-sourced one of their handles, Michael is able to successfully pitch their product and impress them with their flavours. Through this, Michael is able to prove that he is a valuable part of the business.
46	22	"Progress Report #4"	TBA	16 February 2016
Amazing Grapes (Season 2) has increased its revenue, but is not running at capacity and could pull in more profit. Marcus identifies the small kitchen to be an issue, and plans a $75,000 expansion to improve speed and quality. He is disappointed to find that beer and online sales have been poor, and both are the responsibility of beer seller Matt. The staff confide with Marcus that Matt has proven to be lazy, having only put 20% of the inventory online and having no knowledge of the margins and inventory of beer in store. Marcus tasks Matt to give him the numbers, but Matt's apathetic attitude prompts the staff to fire Matt. Returning to Shuler's Bar-B-Que (Season 2), Marcus is impressed with the banquet hall expansion and general store. However, he is also surprised and disappointed that Norton and Lynn have not sought advice from Marcus in setting up the general store, resulting in a disastrously large and eclectic assortment of products, including flamingo decorations and assorted clothing. While Marcus berates the owners for their lack of experience in managing a general store, he sees the banquet hall as a good investment. Before the general store opens, Marcus helps in rearranging the layout to promote more of Shuler's products. Marcus finds Grafton Furniture (Season 3) to be doing well despite the passing of the family patriarch, Esteban. Steve has opened a café for the workers in memory of Esteban. The factory is working efficiently and the design room is generating a high level of revenue. At SJC Drums (Season 3), owner Mike has been successfully selling drum kits on tour and secured contracts. The workshop has expanded, including a CNC machine that can produce a drum shell in 9 minutes. However, the relationship between brothers Mike and Scott has not healed. Marcus counsels Mike and praises his efforts, assuring him that he has done all that he can. Marcus then meets the SJC team at the NAMM Show, exactly a year since they first met. He is happy to see the business finding new lucrative contracts, and ends on a positive note about owners Chris and Mike.

=== Season 4 ===
No. overall	No. in season	Business	Location	Original release date
47	1	"Farrell's Ice Cream Parlour Restaurants"	Southern CA	23 August 2016
Farrell's Ice Cream Parlour is an iconic family-run restaurant chain started in 1963. With originally over a hundred stores, Farrell's eventually closed every location until it was bought by current owners Mike and Paul in 2009. Marcus finds that the current restaurants are merely an imitation of the old Farrell's experience, with uninspired food, loud celebrations, outsourced ice cream and the lack of a unique candy store experience. Marcus takes the team to Universal Studios Hollywood, where he shows them positive food service practices and colourful candy store displays, though this is met with some resistance. Marcus begins to make major changes to the restaurant. He sources a company to begin producing Farrell's original ice cream. He revitalises the candy front by moving manager Sandy (who is also the HR manager) out and assigning merchandise manager Shauna to the role, renovating the restaurant and addressing Mike's negative leadership style. Progress is stalled by a miscalculation, with the owners needing another $200,000 to keep one of their locations open. Regional manager Travis is called in, and he advises that due to rising costs, the location should be closed. Marcus is impressed by his decisiveness and honesty, and decides to give him an equity share in the company and he is assigned to be the general manager of all locations while Mike is in charge of marketing. After a last-minute rush, the restaurant is relaunched. Shauna has greatly revamped the candy store, the kitchen is operating efficiently and Marcus is pleased with everyone in their clearly defined roles. As of June 2019, the store is now closed.
48	2	"DiLascia"	Los Angeles, CA	30 August 2016
Run by Patrick, DiLascia specialises in screen-printed t-shirts and supported by siblings Dan and Kelly. DiLascia has had some initial success, including a partnership with TMZ and several retail outlets. However, one of their retailers went out of business, causing a loss of a third of their revenue. With the majority of the printing screens unused and with over $200,000 in negative equity, the company is effectively insolvent. Marcus offers a deal on the condition that Dan and Kelly eventually each get 10% of company. Marcus soon discovers that the business has no process for product design and has no records of sales. He introduces Patrick to creative studio Two Arrows to focus on his design ideas and to expand his women's line, while also convincing him to close down the unprofitable retail store. Marcus takes Patrick to a Courage.b store (Season 2) in Connecticut to do focus group surveys, but he struggles to handle feedback. Despite his nerves, he delivers a convincing sales pitch to Bloomingdale's and is given the opportunity to do a trunk sale. The plan goes awry when a box of printed shirts is lost in transit, and Marcus is disappointed in Patrick's tendency to hide from problems. Nonetheless, the trunk sale is very popular and Marcus is satisfied with his investment in Patrick.
49	3	"The Soup Market"	Milwaukee, WI	6 September 2016
Dave wishes to turn his soup diner into a national franchise. However, the sudden passing of his business partner has left him managing the business alone. Marcus expresses some concern at the uninspired design for his locations, the lack of lighter healthier options, and Dave's lack of knowledge regarding his profits. There is also a disturbing mystery and avoidance over Dave's former best friend, Grace. After shaking on the deal, Marcus gets Dave's soups tested for nutritional value, bringing up very high levels of fat and sodium, which Dave refuses to alter. Marcus brings in Dean from Precise Graphix (Season 3) to redesign the interior, but Dave continues to resist change and criticises Marcus's chain, The Simple Greek (Season 2), for being too plain. During the redesign, Grace appears, surprising Marcus with her role as co-director of operations. Marcus discovers that Grace has been asked to be invisible due to a perceived affair with Dave. Marcus confronts Dave about his lack of honesty, and Dave admits that his previous feelings for Grace have caused her to suffer due to his mishandling of his personal life. The renovated restaurant launches a grand opening with new healthier recipes from Dave, resulting in very good reception. However, despite organising the event, Grace was excluded from the opening. Marcus, Grace and Dave have a frank talk about the situation, and Dave promises to make positive changes. Weeks later, Grace calls Marcus and informs him that Dave fired her for insubordination and called the police to remove her from the premises. Grace also reveals that she had filed for a sexual harassment claim prior to being terminated. Marcus returns to The Soup Market to find that Dave has reversed all of the changes. Angry at Dave's lack of respect for people, Marcus walks out of the partnership.
50	4	"Flex Watches"	Los Angeles, CA	13 September 2016
Marcus is initially impressed with Flex Watches' product—a cheap comfortable watch with colours reflecting partnered charities, who receive part of the revenue. However, the business has gone off track in response to retailer demand, creating expensive watches and losing the branding and focus on charity. The company also lacks a creative process, with their designs and packaging being uninspired and rushed. Marcus helps the owners get back on track. Consultation with branding experts reveal the trap of adopting too many stereotypical lifestyle motifs. He convinces co-founder Trevor to invest his mother's charitable history back into the company's branding. To address retailers' concerns over selling an inexpensive watch, Marcus creates a silent salesman display, but co-owner Travis rushes the job and creates a plain shelf. After weeks of redesign, pattern selection and website overhaul, the team delivers a positive, successful sales pitch to Flip Flop Shops, who are sold on the cause and story shared by the Flex team.
51	5	"Honest Foods"	Chicago, IL	20 September 2016
Honest Foods is a catering company run by Tad. Marcus witnesses the team in action at a corporate function, and is impressed with the quality of the food, but finds the presentation lacklustre. Marcus also finds that Tad can be an aggressive micromanager. The business is in a bad situation due to its focus on catering for the film industry, resulting in unstable seasonal business. Marcus addresses Tad's management style after his employees become aggravated during a buffet luncheon, telling him to delegate and let them learn to solve problems on their own. Marcus decides to expand into the food truck industry to have more predictable revenue. When Tad arrives with the truck, the employees reveal that they are on the verge of a mutiny due to Tad's lack of communication. Marcus allows them to air their concerns and explains that the food trucks will benefit them on top of their hourly wage, and manages to buy a second food truck for the business. However, an inspection of Tad's food truck reveals numerous needed repairs, and Marcus confronts Tad over his oversight. Tad snaps and swears at Marcus, but Marcus soothes Tad's anxiety and explains that this is how his employees feel about him. Marcus arranges Honest Foods to cater for the 50th anniversary of his company, Camping World and Good Sam. Tad shows a huge change in being a supportive leader and the team set up a grilled cheese and shaved ice truck, along with catering for the 1000-person event. Despite a thunderstorm, the team impressed Marcus with its unique displays and organization. Marcus celebrates with the team and predicts that Honest Foods will be the go-to catering company in Chicago.
52	6	"Murchison-Hume"	Dallas, TX	27 September 2016
Murchison-Hume is a natural cleaning products company started by Max Kater in Sydney, Australia. Although Marcus likes the idea of all-natural cleaning products, he questioned their higher price-points and prestige marketing. The company financials at the time were showing heavy losses due to a dishonest Managing Director in Australia who was recently fired. Max asks for a million-dollar valuation on the strength of growing multi-national sales, but Marcus rebuffs this proposal. Marcus counters with a $250,000 for 30% ownership of Murchison-Hume, and a controversial proposal to carve out a new company, which illegally excluded their original investors and gave himself a 70% stake in their new company, featuring their Best in Show Pet brand. Marcus encounters problems with Max. He proposes a name change to "Good Mother," and demands a total re-brand, which Max initially complies with, but ultimately rejects. Later, on her original investor's advice, Max attempts to re-negotiate the deal, proposing that Marcus only get 15% of the ownership upfront and earns his way up. This infuriates Marcus, and he leaves. Marcus's return to the company office reveals that against his advice, Max has pushed ahead with turning the office into a mini-distribution center. Max agrees to the original terms of the deal with the condition of maintaining the Murchison-Hume existing branding. However, upon moving all of their inventory to his warehouse, Marcus discovers that instead of $280,000 of inventory, they only have $50,000 in ready-made goods, with the balance in raw materials. Marcus is furious that her part-time Accountant was unavailable for a call. Frustrated, he ultimately walks out on the deal, but later returns to buy the Best In Show trademark.
53	7	"Pacific Hospitality"	Los Angeles, CA	4 October 2016
Based in California, Pacific Hospitality creates furniture for the commercial market, with contracts to major companies such as The Coffee Bean, MGM and Caesars Palace. The company has a similar history to Marcus's previous investment, Grafton Furniture (Season 3). Both were successful immigrant family businesses which had problems with profit margins and manufacturing processes. On the back of Grafton's successful transformation and impressed with the owner's daughter, Ana, Marcus proposes an unusual deal: that Pacific Hospitality be co-owned by Marcus and Grafton. Marcus identifies that the companies and personnel complement each other, as Grafton specialises in residential furniture and Pacific deals with hospitality and retail. Marcus hopes that Pacific can manufacture Grafton products and service the West Coast, which Grafton has struggled in. The Pacific Hospitality warehouse is emptied and redesigned to implement a production line, with Ana impressing Marcus with her own floor plan design. Marcus tasks Ana and Grafton owner and designer Steve to do a pitch for a furniture package for The Simple Greek franchisees (Season 2). Steve is offended when Marcus delegates the design role to Ana and decides to make a competing design. Marcus is correct with his prediction: Steve's design is good, but not practical or attractive for a restaurant franchise, while Ana's creative process tries to blend in with the concept. Steve, accustomed to being told what to make, has difficulty accepting feedback. Later, Marcus decides to merge the two companies into one. Steve balks at being removed from design, but Marcus explains that Steve's superior management skills and Ana's design talents would benefit the overall health of the company. Steve throws his support behind Ana, and Marcus assigns Ana to be his chief designer for all his businesses. The Pacific Furniture warehouse is successfully renovated and Marcus is optimistic that the systems that he has put in place will greatly improve profits.
54	8	"Tea2Go"	Dallas, TX	11 October 2016
Tea2Go is a small-scale tea franchise run by Jeff and son Taylor, who dropped out of college to help his father. Marcus notes the barren, minimalist design—the lack of food and accessories, and even the franchise name—implies that it is purely a take-out store. The company is insolvent with a million-dollar debt, with Jeff investing poorly in building and selling corporate stores and franchisees being poorly supported. Marcus also notes that Jeff has no passion or interest in tea. In moving forward, Marcus rebrands the concept as “The American Tea & Spice Shop”. He erases the payables owed to the tea distributor by offering him equity in the company. While he organises the prototype build, Marcus deals with Taylor's immaturity and his rocky relationship with Jeff. Jeff effectively disowns Taylor despite Marcus's efforts at mediation. Problems also arise when Jeff continues to try to sell the old Tea2Go franchise, despite not being aware of franchise law and essentially competing with Marcus to maintain a separate entity. Marcus sees this is a blessing in disguise, as he can now start up a new holding company and the franchisees can decide where to go. The prototype American Tea & Spice Shop is successfully opened. Marcus and the franchisees are very pleased with the vision. Marcus is particularly impressed with Taylor's change of attitude, and offers to pay for Taylor to complete his marketing studies.
55	9	"Bowery Kitchen Supplies"	New York, NY	18 October 2016
A kitchenware store owned by former husband and wife pair Howard and Robyn, Bowery is a mess. The store lacks organisation and merchandising, and there is no inventory system. Howard spends a lot of time away from the business and asserts a dominant hand in controlling what happens in the store. Because of Howard's impulsive buys, the store has accumulated too much useless inventory and has an overwhelming about of debt. Marcus's first order is to liquidate everything in the store, raising over $300,000 in cash and clearing the space to do a complete renovation. Marcus and Robyn work together to decide which departments to feature in the store, but Howard opposes Robyn's ideas. Marcus warns Robyn to stop Howard from being the dominant voice in order to save the business. Howard continues to frustrate Marcus with his absences, and the relationships becomes tense when Howard continuously sends threatening emails to Marcus. Marcus discovers that Howard has been very anxious over the lack of funds, and Robyn reveals that she has been hiding money from Howard to protect him from himself. Despite Howard taking a vacation during the reopening, he comes on board and together the team successfully launch the grand opening of a much cleaner, more organised store.
56	10	"Los Gemelos"	Port Chester, NY	22 November 2016
Started as an authentic Mexican restaurant by Adelo, Los Gemelos expanded into producing tortillas. However, business dropped when Mission Foods broke into the regional market. Referred by George Lopez, Marcus takes an interest in the tortilla factory, but is shocked to find that Adelo's operations are not compliant with food and occupational safety codes. Marcus decides on a different deal than what he normally proposes. He instructs Adelo to close the factory instead of investing in it, and instead he proposes a new Hispanic food company using Marcus's business skills, Adelo's knowledge of authentic Mexican food, and George's image and marketing. Adelo has some initial problems with understanding the need for detailed market research, including an assumption that Mission Foods would be a better distributor, which Marcus rebuffed. He also did not mention his factory's eviction and loss of his equipment. Despite this, Adelo impresses Marcus and George with his salsa recipes and the new “Ta Loco” brand, taking George's catch phrase. Marcus arranges a sales pitch with Sam's Club, fulfilling Adelo's dream of making it into a large retailer. Adelo successfully seals with the deal with his promise of authenticity and Marcus reflects positively on taking a risk with Adelo.
57	11	"Susana Monaco"	New York, NY	29 November 2016
Susana is the owner and creative head of fashion label Susana Monaco, although she is easily intimidated by the business side, which she leaves in the hands of Anna. Marcus notes Susana's shaky confidence and causes: her father Mario is pressuring her to divide her stock between her brothers, who currently work in the factory owned by Mario. Anna is also using her leverage in demanding 50/50 ownership or a higher wage than Susana. Marcus addresses the problem of having too much inventory, low cashflow and excessive collection. He proposes several shipping options with different price points to stabilise cash flow. However, Anna snaps and has a breakdown, citing a lack of respect and Susana doesn't step up to her. Marcus brings in Stephanie from Courage.b (Season 2), now in charge of Marcus's fashion businesses, to help with building a core collection. Marcus holds a liquidation sale for the dead inventory. Susana struggles to come out of her shell to express herself, and Marcus continues to work on helping her be more assertive, especially towards Anna. With the investment money, Marcus is able to acquire more fabrics for Susana to work with. Marcus organises a fashion show to exhibit Susana's core designs and spring collection. Anna continues to be controlling, and Susana finally stands up for herself and establishes her authority as the owner. The fashion show, attended by Susana's father Mario, is a successful showcase.
58	12	"SWIM By Chuck Handy"	Miami, FL	6 June 2017
A family-run swimwear company struggles to connect with consumers.
59	13	"Windward Board Shop"	Chicago, IL	13 June 2017
A Chicago snowboard shop goes downhill after its owners try to expand too quickly.
60	14	"Ashtae Products"	Greensboro, NC	20 June 2017
A family-owned hair care company hits a breaking point because of the father's costly side projects.
61	15	"Overtone Acoustics"	Orlando, FL	27 June 2017
Marcus helps a sound-proofing company, started by two best friends, which relies on volunteers.
62	16	"Bodhi Leaf Coffee Traders"	Orange, CA	7 July 2017
Marcus helps a California entrepreneur who went all-in on a coffee business with no experience.
63	17	"Hip Pops"	South Florida	18 July 2017
Marcus helps a gelato popsicle company whose owner jumped the gun by starting a franchise business.
64	18	"Zoe's Chocolate"	Waynesboro, PA	25 July 2017
A family-owned chocolate shop was started by three siblings in support of their chocolatier father.
65	19	"Special: "Top 10 Rules for Success"	N/A	1 August 2017
Marcus Lemonis shares his top 10 most important rules for success while sharing past episodes.
66	20	"Special: "Marijuana Millions""	Humboldt County, CA	8 August 2017
In a special episode, Marcus Lemonis travels to the marijuana capital of America -- Humboldt County, in northern California. This time, he’s here not to invest, but to meet the growers and entrepreneurs who are betting on the future of pot.

=== Season 5 ===
No. overall	No. in season	Business	Location	Original release date
67	1	Special: "Biggest Wins and Most Heartbreaking Losses"	N/A	November 21, 2017
68	2	"Tumbleweed Tiny Homes"	Colorado Springs, CO	November 28, 2017
69	3	"Detroit Denim"	Detroit, MI	December 5, 2017
70	4	"Monica Potter Home"	TBA	December 12, 2017
71	5	"Mr Cory's Cookies"	Englewood, NJ	December 19, 2017
00	0	Special: "The Profit in Marijuana Country"	Humboldt, CA	January 2, 2018
72	6	"Rayjus" and "Bentley's Pet Stuff"	Morris, IL	January 9, 2018
73	7	"JD Custom Designs"	Fullerton, CA	January 16, 2018
74	8	"Faded Royalty"	TBA	January 23, 2018
75	9	"Southern Culture"	Atlanta, Georgia	February 6, 2018
76	10	"Fighting for Farrell's"	TBA	February 27, 2018
77	11	"Tankfarm & Co."	Southern California	June 12, 2018
78	12	"The Casery"	Los Angeles, California	June 19, 2018
79	13	"Ellison Eyewear"	Chicago, Illinois	June 26, 2018
80	14	"Diaper Dude"	Los Angeles, California	July 3, 2018
81	15	"Simply Slices"	Crestwood, Illinois	July 10, 2018
82	16	"Hangout Lighting"	Chicago, Illinois	July 17, 2018
83	17	"Montiel"	Los Angeles, California	July 24, 2018
84	18	"Baby Bump"	New Orleans, Louisiana	July 31, 2018

=== Season 6 ===
No. overall	No. in season	Business	Location	Original release date
85	1	"NYC Bagel Deli"	Chicago, IL	December 4, 2018
86	2	"Queork"	New Orleans, LA	December 11, 2018
87	3	"Santa's Toys"	Santa Claus, IN	December 18, 2018
88	4	"Ben's Garden"	New York, NY	January 15, 2019
89	5	"Casery 2.0"	Hollywood, CA	January 23, 2019
90	6	"Jackie's Cookie Connection"	Los Angeles, CA	February 12, 2019
91	7	"Lyles BBQ"	Lexington, KY	February 19, 2019
92	8	"Snowdays NYC"	New York, NY	February 26, 2019
93	9	"Feat Socks"	Santa Monica, CA	March 5, 2019
94	10	"Smithfly Designs"	Troy, OH	March 12, 2019
95	11	"Handi Products"	Libertyville, IL	March 19, 2019

=== Season 7 ===
No. overall	No. in season	Business	Location	Original release date
85	1	"Dante's"	Rockaway, NJ	November 5, 2019
86	2	"CocoTaps"	Las Vegas, NV	November 12, 2019
87	3	"Skinny Latina"	Daytona Beach, FL	November 19, 2019
88	4	"Polar Bear Coolers"	Atlanta, GA	November 26, 2019
89	5	"Macaron Queen"	Atlanta, GA	December 3, 2019
90	6	"Hatbox" and "Ramp"	Austin, TX and Park City, UT	December 10, 2019
91	7	"Las Vegas Mini Gran Prix"	Las Vegas, NV	December 17, 2019
92	8	First Look: "Mississippi River Cleanup"	Grafton, IL	January 7, 2020
93	9	"Floodtown"	TBA	January 21, 2020
94	10	"B Sweet"	Los Angeles, CA	January 28, 2020
95	11	"Cover your Hide"	Los Angeles, CA	February 11, 2020
96	12	"Who's the Big Cheese"	New York City, NY	February 18, 2020
97	13	"A Crash Course in Van Life"	Los Angeles, CA	February 25, 2020

=== Season 8 ===
No. overall	No. in season	Business	Location	Original release date
98	1	"Mo Honey, Mo Problems"	Salt Lake City, UT	August 10, 2021
99	2	"Any Way You Slice It"	Santa Monica, CA	August 17, 2021
100	3	"Checks and Balances"	Los Angeles, CA	August 24, 2021
101	4	"Sweet Dreams Are Made of This"	Salt Lake City, UT	August 31, 2021
102	5	"Who's the Boss?"	Petaluma, CA	September 7, 2021
103	6	"A New Leash of Life"	Draper, UT	September 14, 2021
104	7	"Claws and Effect"	Brooklyn, NY	September 21, 2021
105	8	"Raise the Roof"	Cedar City, UT	September 28, 2021
