= Venus Shakarian Toner =

American sportswoman

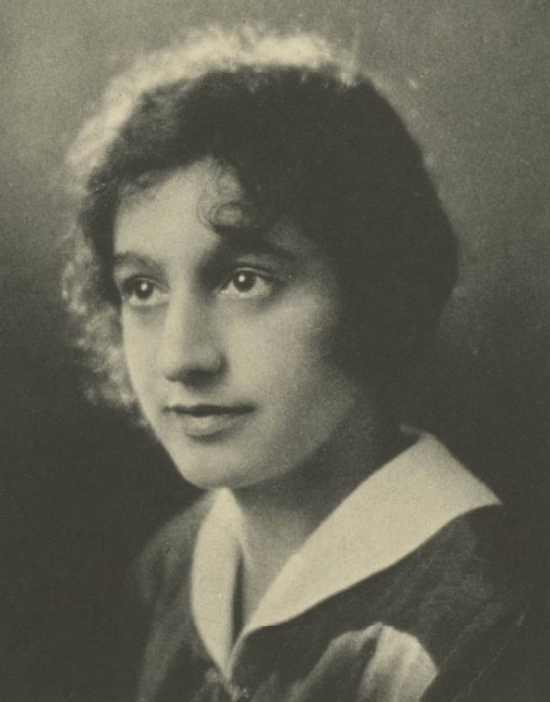
- Venus Shakarian, from the 1928 yearbook of the University of Pittsburgh
- Born: Venus Shakarian; December 19, 1906; Pittsburgh, Pennsylvania, U.S.
- Died: March 6, 1995 (aged 88); Pittsburgh, Pennsylvania, U.S.
- Other names: Vee Toner, Vee Shakarian
- Occupations: Pilot, educator, sports official and umpire
- Relatives: David Shakarian (brother)

Venus Shakarian Toner (December 19, 1906 – March 6, 1995) was an American pilot, educator, and sportswoman from Pittsburgh, Pennsylvania. She was the first American woman to be named a chair umpire at Wimbledon. She was inducted into the Pennsylvania Sports Hall of Fame in 1982.

== Early life and education ==
Shakarian was born in the East Liberty neighborhood of Pittsburgh, the daughter of Hogop "Harry" David Shakarian and Dorothy Peshdimaljian Shakarian. Her parents were Armenian immigrants from Istanbul. Her father ran a sandwich and yogurt shop, which her younger brothers Bart and David Shakarian took over in the 1930s, and built into the General Nutrition Center chain of stores.

She attended Peabody High School and graduated from the University of Pittsburgh in 1928. At Pitt, she competed in basketball, tennis, and swimming, and was president of the Women's Athletic Association on campus. She was national president of Cwens, an honor society for college sophomores, in 1925. She pursued further studies at the University of California, Los Angeles, the University of Wisconsin, and the University of Oxford.

== Career ==
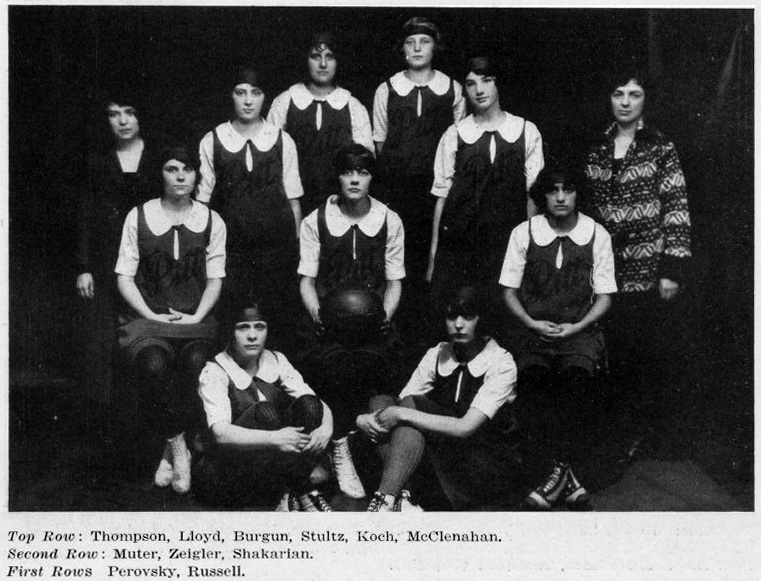
The undefeated 1924-25 Pitt women's varsity basketball team; Venus Shakarian is on the right, seated in the center row.

Shakarian taught physical education and was a licensed pilot in the 1930s. She was an active member of the Ninety-Nines, an organization for women in aviation, and spoke on radio about her experiences with flight. She participated in air races.

Shakarian remained active in amateur and school sports after college. She competed in a tennis tournament in 1929. She was an official at the 1955 and 1959 Pan-American Games, in Mexico City and Chicago, respectively. She was a member of the United States Olympic Committee in 1956, when she managed the women's swimming team in Melbourne, and in 1960. She managed and chaperoned the American swimmers at the International Swimming Festival in Bremen in 1975.

Shakarian also supported professional sports. She was an official at international tennis tournaments, and was the first American woman named chair umpire at Wimbledon. She frequently attended college and professional football games. "I attend every Steelers game," she told an interviewer in 1977. She stopped officiating at professional tennis tournaments in 1979, citing the coarser language and behavior of the players.

She was Delta Zeta’s Woman of the Year in 1969, and the sorority started the Vee Shakarian Toner Student Loan Fund in 1973, in her honor. In1982 she was inducted into the Pennsylvania Sports Hall of Fame; she was also in the University of Pittsburgh Sports Hall of Fame and the Western Pennsylvania Sports Hall of Fame.

== Personal life ==
In addition to her professional activities, Shakarian was known to be an expert knitter. She was seriously injured in a car accident in 1935. In 1937, she married civil engineer and businessman Arthur Carling Toner Jr. Her husband died in 1972 and she died in 1995, at the age of 88, in Pittsburgh.
