= Harbin Pharmaceutical Group =

Chinese pharmaceutical company

Harbin Pharmaceutical Group Co., Ltd.
- Type: Public
- Traded as: SSE: 600664
- Industry: Pharmaceuticals
- Predecessor: Harbin Pharmaceutical Administration
- Founded: 1988; 38 years ago
- Headquarters: Harbin, Heilongjiang, China
- Area served: Worldwide
- Owner: Harbin SASAC (38.25%); CITIC Capital (19.1%)
- Number of employees: 20,100 (2014)
- Subsidiaries: GNC Holdings, LLC; Renmintongtai (SSE: 600829)

Chinese name
- Simplified Chinese: 哈药集团有限公司
- Traditional Chinese: 哈藥集團有限公司
Transcriptions
Standard Mandarin
- Hanyu Pinyin: Hāyào Jítuán Yǒuxiàn gōngsī

Shortened name
- Simplified Chinese: 哈药集团
- Traditional Chinese: 哈藥集團
Transcriptions
Standard Mandarin
- Hanyu Pinyin: Hāyào Jítuán
- Website: hayao.com

Harbin Pharmaceutical Group Co., Ltd. (shortened to HPGC or Hayao) is a Chinese partially state-owned company engaged in the research & development, manufacture, and sale of pharmaceutical products. HPGC medication offerings include traditional Chinese medicine (TCM) and biopharmaceuticals; its main offerings include antibiotics, including amoxicillin and penicillin, and dietary supplements, including zinc gluconate and calcium gluconate.

The company owns both Renmintongtai (人民同泰), a drugstore chain and medical wholesaler for the domestic market, and GNC, a U.S.-based international retailer of supplements and wellness products.

== History ==
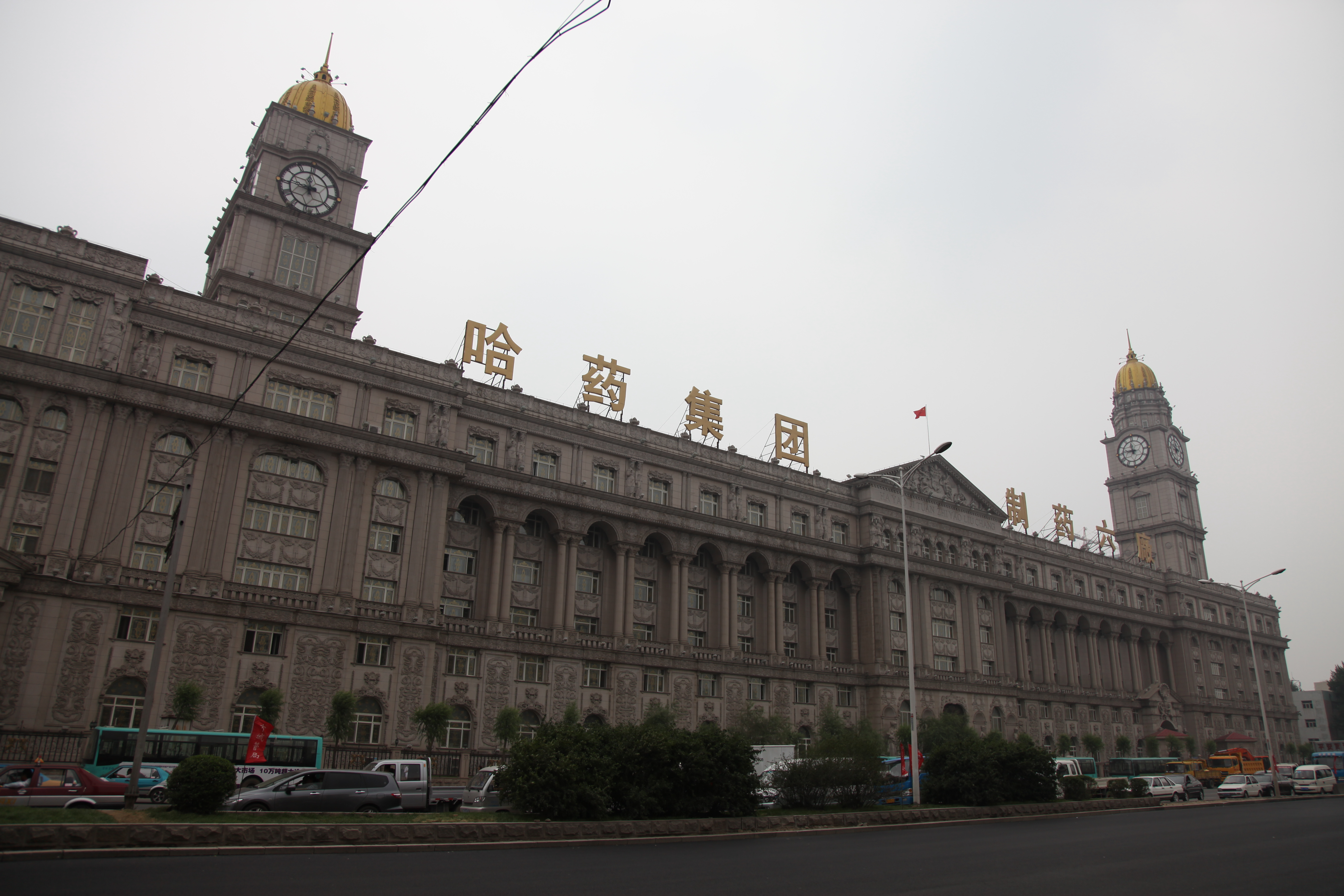
Harbin Pharmaceutical Group Factory No. 6

In 2007, HPGC obtained approximately 73% and 14% of its total revenue from the sale of Western medicines and TCM preparations, respectively.

In February 2018, HPGC announced its intentions to purchase a 40% stake in GNC Holdings, Inc. for US$300 million, following GNC's filing for Chapter 11 bankruptcy. In September 2020, it wholly acquired the company for US$770 million.

HPGC manufactures and distributes products for GNC China (known as 健安喜; Jiàn'ānxǐ) under a joint venture, GNC (Shanghai) Food Technology Co., Ltd, formed in February 2019.

In February 2022, HPGC was stripped of its National Enterprise Technology Center status, a state designation for enterprises identified as capable of extraordinary technology innovation, by the National Development and Reform Commission after failing to meet the previous year's qualification requirements.

Harbin Pharmaceutical Group No. 6 Factory is renowned for its magnificent architecture, splendid exterior, and strong European style, earning it the nickname "The Oriental Louvre." On January 16, 2024, Harbin Pharmaceutical Group Co., Ltd. announced through its official Douyin (TikTok) account that the factory would be open to the public, and the Printmaking Museum would offer free admission. On the opening day, Harbin No. 6 Pharmaceutical Factory welcomed more than 20,000 visitors, with many waiting in line for over an hour to enter.
