= Denim & Soul =

- Formerly: The Blue Jeans Bar
- Company type: Private
- Industry: Retail
- Founder: Lady Fuller
- Headquarters: San Francisco, U.S.
- Area served: U.S.
- Products: Jeans
- Website: shopdenimsoul.com

Denim & Soul, formerly known as The Blues Jean Bar, is an American denim retailer, with locations in San Francisco, Santa Monica, San Jose, Mill Valley, Dallas, Denver, Boston, Chicago, and New Orleans. It is described as being "modeled on the concept of a friendly neighborhood pub", with each store featuring "a large bar lined with pub petting stations and tended by jean-tenders" serving blue jeans rather than drinks. The company also has a fleet of vans going from place to place which specialize in private shopping parties. The company was founded by Lady Fuller (née Reiss).

In November 2015, the company was featured on Season 3 of the reality television show The Profit.

As of 2020, the main domain of Blues Jean Bar has been acquired by VooBeauty.
