= David Shakarian =

American businessman

- Born: February 27, 1914
- Died: September 11, 1984 (aged 70); Pittsburgh, Pennsylvania, U.S.
- Occupation: Businessman
- Spouse: Lois M. Vinton (1941-1984)
- Children: 2
- Relatives: Venus Shakarian Toner (sister)

David B. Shakarian (February 27, 1914 – September 11, 1984) was an American businessman. He was the founder, chief executive officer, and chairman of GNC.

== Early life ==
David B. Shakarian was born on February 27, 1914, to Armenian parents, the owner of a store where they sold "yogurt, buttermilk, and Bulgarian cultured milk." He had a brother, Bart Shakarian.

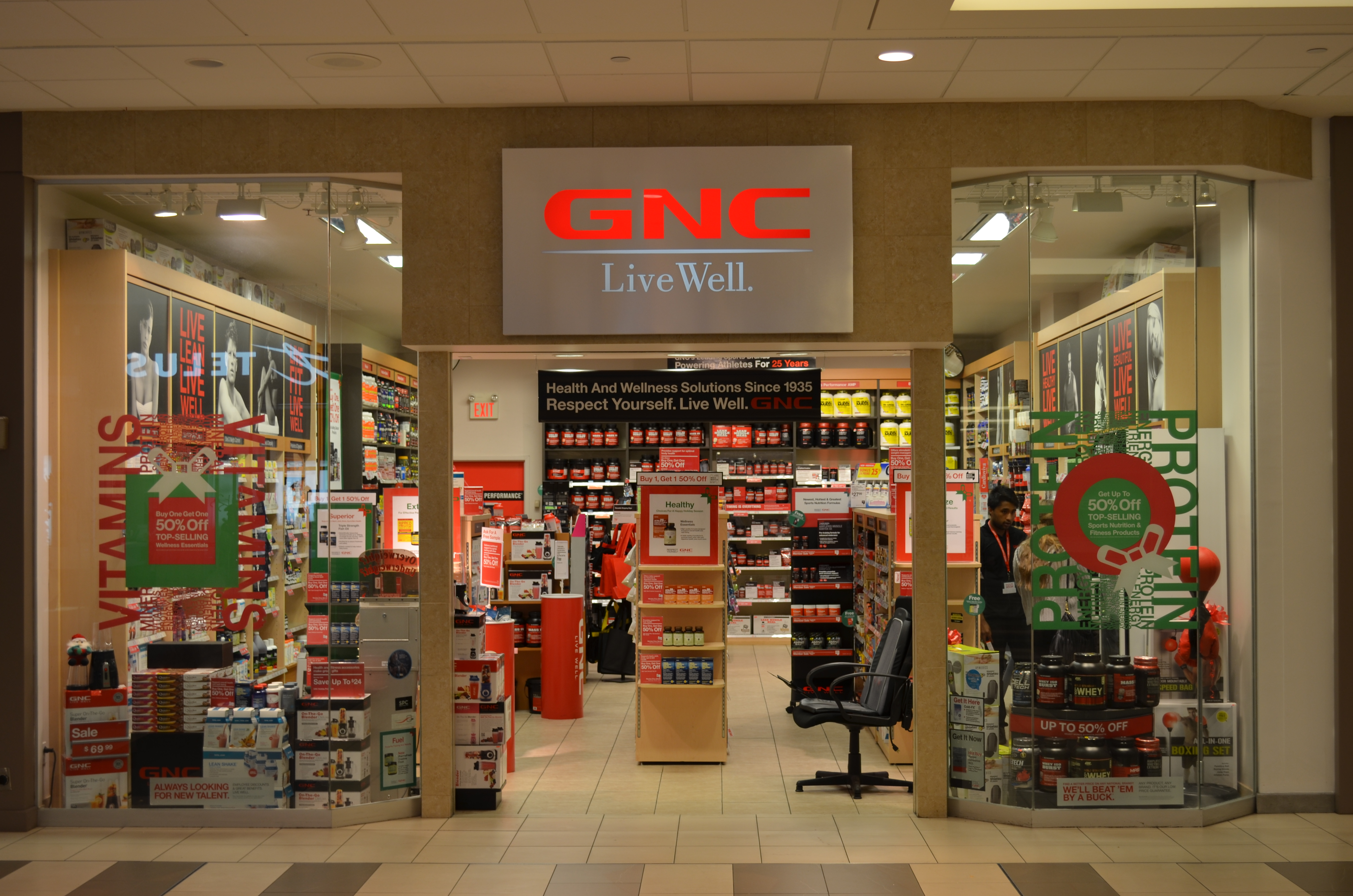
A GNC store

== Career ==
Shakarian turned his family health store into GNC, a chain of stores which sold vitamins and fitness products. He served as its chairman and chief executive officer. By 1984, he operated 1,200 stores in the United States and Canada and made 2,000 health products.

Shakarian spearheaded the development of Bonita Bay, a 2,400-acre residential facility in Bonita Springs, Florida, for $1.1 billion. However, by the time of his death, the project was only expected to be completed two decades later.

== Personal life and death ==
Shakarian married Lois M. Vinton on June 16, 1941. They had twin daughters. He had a heart attack in 1969. He resided in the Gateway Towers, a residential skyscraper in Pittsburgh, and maintained another property in Marco Island, Florida.

Shakarian died of cancer on September 11, 1984. His widow remarried twice and died in 2002.

== Dispute over will ==
A year after Shakarian's death, his brother, who was also GNC's vice chairman, and GNC's former president Gary Daum, sued over the validity of the will. They argued that Shakarian "was not mentally competent to understand the nature and extent of his estate."
