= GNC (company) =

U.S.-based health and wellness retailer

GNC Holdings, LLC

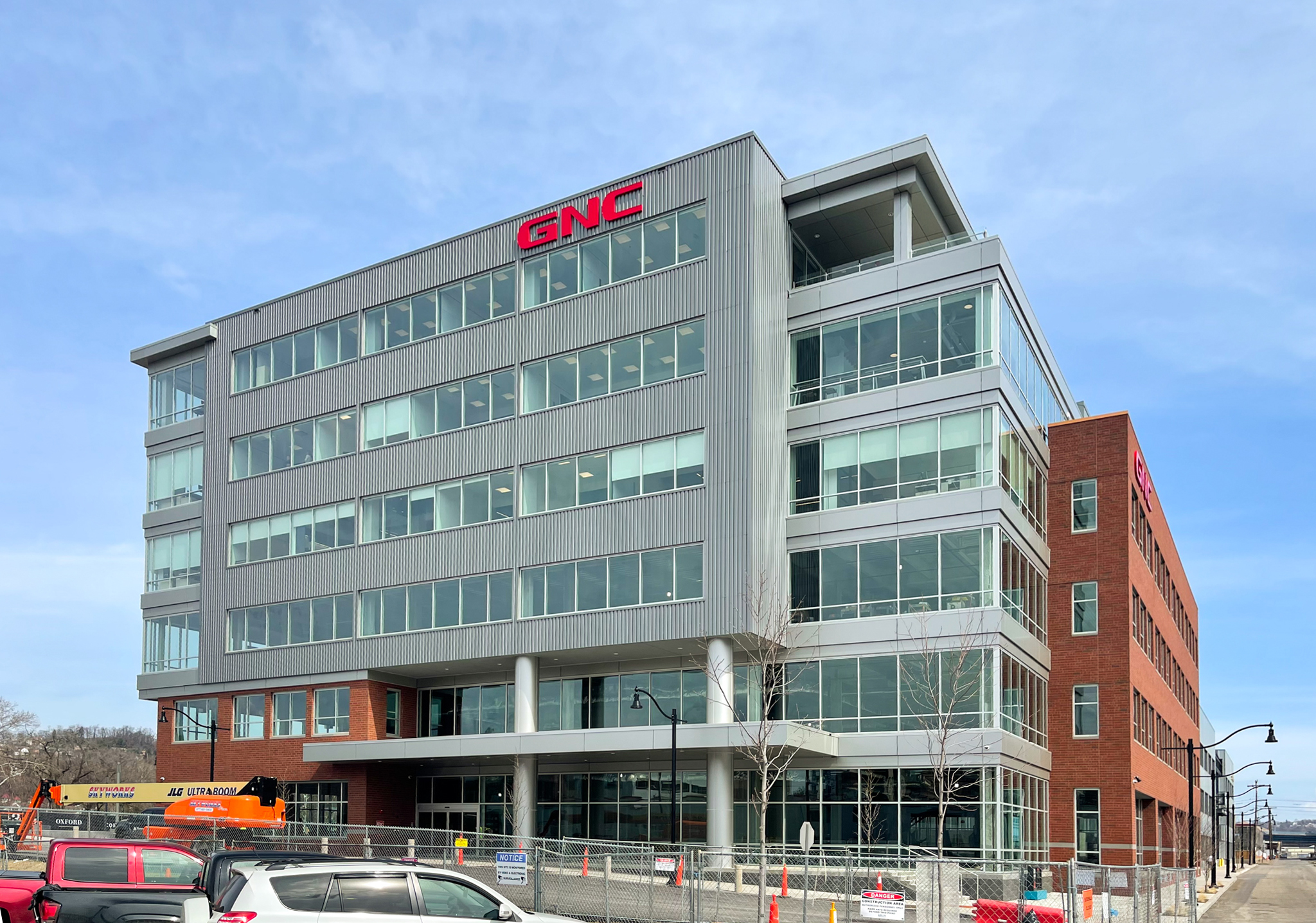
- GNC's new global headquarters
- Formerly: GNC Holdings, Inc.
- Type: Subsidiary
- Industry: Healthcare Franchising
- Founded: 1935; 91 years ago
- Founder: David Shakarian
- Headquarters: Pittsburgh, Pennsylvania, U.S.
- Number of locations: 2,281 U.S. stores (2022)
- Products: Dietary supplements; Bodybuilding supplements; Protein supplements; Multivitamins
- Parent: Harbin Pharmaceutical Group (2020–present)
- Website: gnc.com

GNC Holdings, LLC (General Nutrition Centers) is an American multinational retail and nutritional manufacturing company based in Pittsburgh, Pennsylvania. It specializes in health and nutrition related products, including vitamins, supplements, minerals, herbs, sports nutrition, diet, and energy products. It is a wholly owned subsidiary of Harbin Pharmaceutical Group, a Chinese state-owned pharmaceutical manufacturer.

== History ==
In 1935, David Shakarian, an Armenian-American businessman, opened a small health food store originally named Lackzoom, in downtown Pittsburgh. He made US$35 on his first day and was able to open a second store within six months. Despite initial setbacks, such as the Ohio River flooding into downtown on St. Patrick's Day that wiped out both stores in 1936, Shakarian persevered and reopened the next year. He later expanded into mail-order sales of health foods, vitamins, and prescription drugs, capitalizing on the growing interest in physical fitness and health consciousness during the 1960s.

In the 1960s, the company changed the name of its stores to General Nutrition Centers. Shakarian stepped down as chief executive officer in February 1984 but continued as chairman until his death later that year.

Shakarian took GNC public (listed on the NYSE) in the 1980s. Gary Daum was named chief executive office in February 1984. In May 1985, Jerry Horn took on the role. GNC was taken private and sold to Thomas H. Lee Partners a PE investment/management fund in the late 1980s. Thomas Lee ran GNC and took it public prior to selling the company to Royal Dutch Numico and Numico acquired GNC in 1999; it sold GNC to Apollo Management in 2003. Ontario Teachers' Pension Plan and Ares Management bought GNC in 2007. GNC went public in 2011. In 1990, the company considered relocating but a public/private effort retained GNC headquarters in Downtown Pittsburgh.

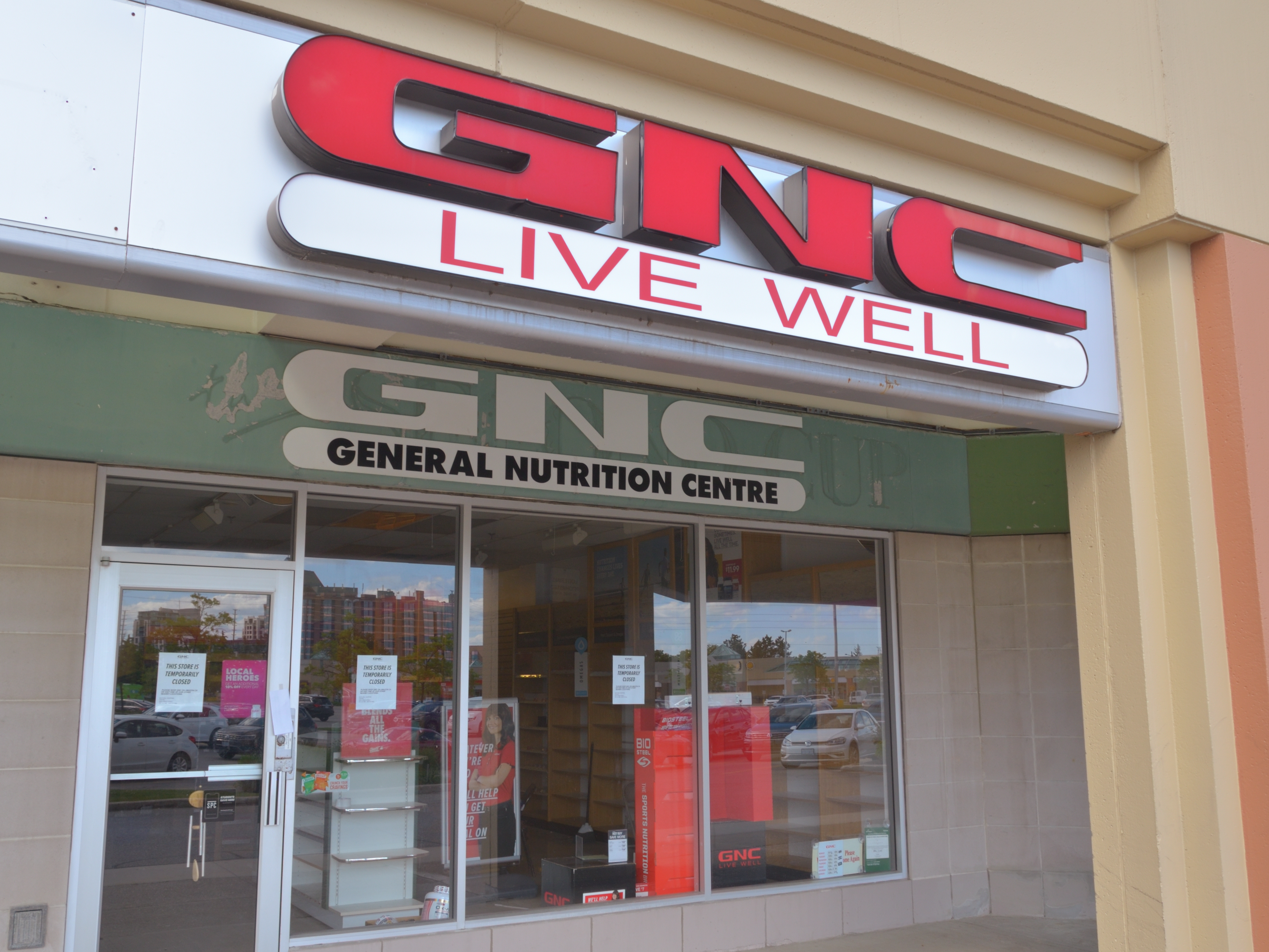
An empty and closed GNC store in June 2020

In 2018, the Chinese state-owned Harbin Pharmaceutical Group agreed to acquire an approximately 40% stake in GNC. In September 2020, Senator Marco Rubio asked the Committee on Foreign Investment in the United States to examine the proposed acquisition on data protection and national security grounds.

In November 2018, the company announced they would be closing up to 900 stores over 3 years. In July 2019, it was announced that they planned to close up to 1,400 company owned retail locations, primarily those located within shopping malls.

In June 2020, GNC filed for Chapter 11 bankruptcy protection due to the negative impact of the COVID-19 Lockdowns and Stay-at-home orders that severely impacted store traffic; resulting in the closure of at least 800 stores. Effective on June 30, 2020, the stock was delisted from the New York Stock Exchange and shifted to the OTC Markets Group. In September 2020, the bankruptcy court in Delaware approved the private sale of GNC for $770 million to Harbin Pharmaceutical Group and CITIC Capital. In October 2020, Harbin Pharmaceutical Group, a Chinese state-owned pharmaceutical manufacturer, acquired the remainder of the company.

The company was sold under a private 363 sale thus cancelling the Chapter 11 process under the new ownership of Harbin Pharmaceutical Group in October 2020. In 2021, GNC revealed that Josh Burris will take over as CEO, Nate Frazier as COO and Cam Lawrence as CFO.

In 2021, GNC announced a partnership with Walmart for a selection of GNC specific products.

In 2021, GNC launched their Venture Capital Arm under the name GNC Ventures. Led by COO Nate Frazier's investment in Real Eats. Additional investments include supplement brands, POS and OMS software companies.

In 2023, COO Nate Frazier unveiled GNC's Flagship in the heart of Pittsburgh. Starting with significant upgrades into the brand's tech stack. A major part of that was updating point-of-sale systems to allow for more in-store ordering, plus functions like loyalty programs. The newest version of the system also allows store associates to be able to sell outside of the store – such as going to a marathon, community event or parking lot tailgate, by utilizing mobile point-of-sale systems.

In May 2025, U.S. representative Pat Harrigan introduced legislation that would prohibit GNC's presence on U.S. military bases due to its Harbin ownership.

== Retail and online stores ==
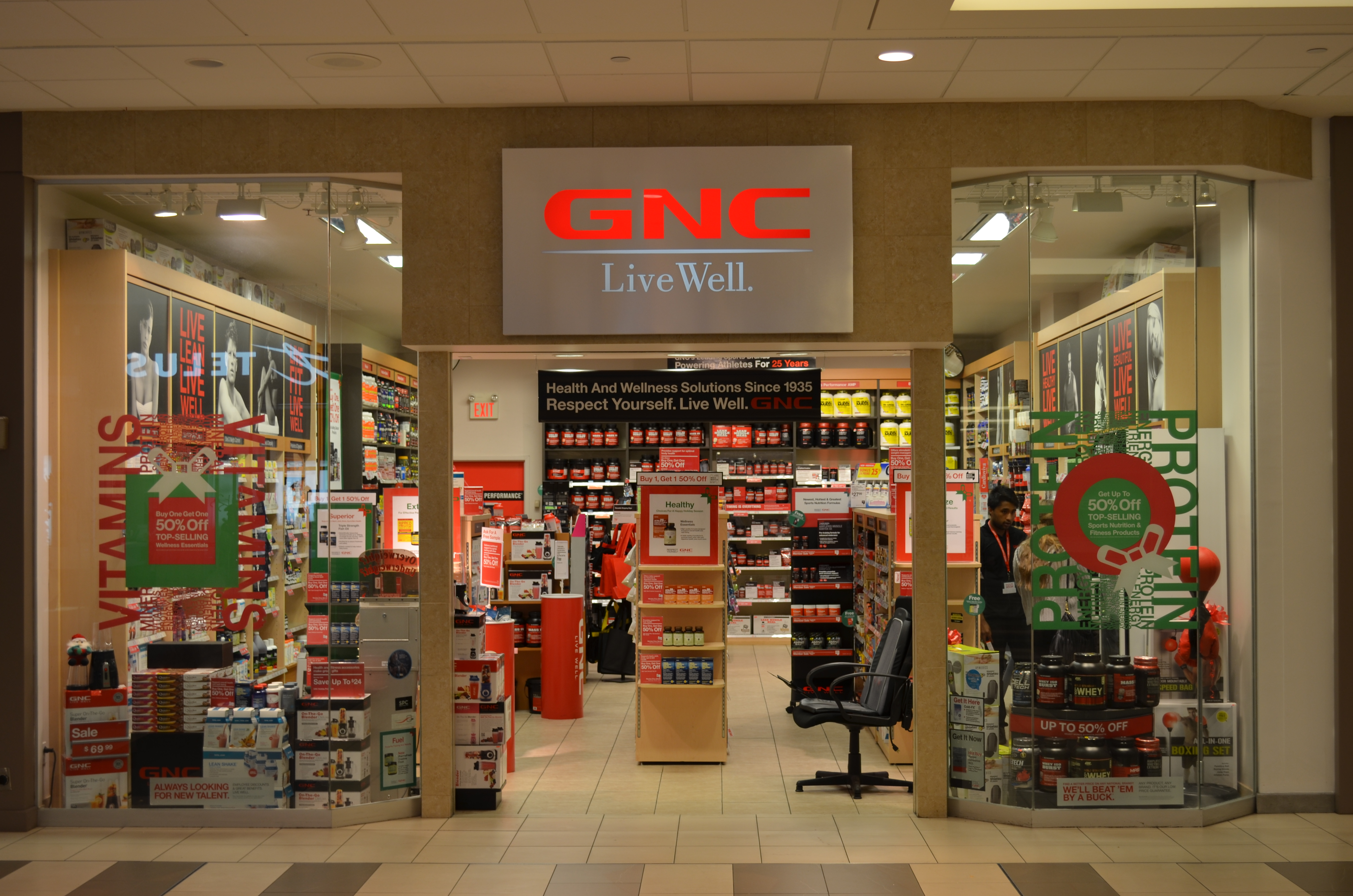
A GNC store at The Promenade Shopping Centre, Thornhill, Ontario, Canada

GNC stores typically stock a wide range of weight loss, bodybuilding, nutritional supplements, vitamins, natural remedies, and health and beauty products, in both its owned brands as well as third-party brands. Its products are also sold on GNC.com and, as of January 2017, on GNC's Amazon Marketplace.

The company offers consumer products and services via retail locations, like their own stores, franchises, online, digital commerce and wholesales and retail partnerships. They have over 17,500 employees working in their stores and sell lots of different things from over 325 brands, with more than 7,500 things available in their stores and on their website. GNC4U is a program for monthly subscription deliveries of personalized vitamins and supplements.

On December 31, 2018, GNC had approximately 8,400 locations, of which approximately 6,200 were in the United States (including approximately 2,200 Rite Aid licensed store-within-a-store locations), as well as franchise operations in approximately 50 countries.

Of GNC's approximately 4,100 U.S. locations in 2019, 61% were in strip malls and 28% were in larger malls.

In July 2023, the company announced it would begin making deliveries in select markets via drone.

== GNC Health ==
GNC Health was created in 2023, and provides different health options to members such as virtual appointments and medications.

== Franchising ==
In 1988, GNC began offering franchising opportunities. They sell various third-party brands such as Glaxon Electro Creatine. GNC also offers exclusive energy formula powders and G Fuel energy drinks that are available for purchase both online at GNC.com and at GNC stores across the country. The company offers a turnkey business model that includes training, marketing support, and access to GNC's proprietary products. However, franchisees are required to pay an initial franchise fee, ongoing royalties, and adhere to certain operational standards. there are also some potential drawbacks to franchising with GNC. Franchisees are required to follow GNC's operational standards, which can limit their ability to innovate and differentiate themselves from other GNC locations. Additionally, ongoing royalties can eat into profit margins, and franchisees may be subject to additional fees for marketing and advertising support. Over the years many of GNC's Franchisees have excelled and have been recognized nationally for their success. In March 2022 COO Nate Frazier Announced that Franchisee Laura Dalton had been recognized as the IFA Franchisee of the year.

== Science ==
=== Beyond Raw ===
GNC is a company that offers creatine supplements in both pill and powder forms through its GNC AMP® and Beyond Raw® Chemistry Labs product lines. Their products have been scientifically supported and clinically tested, such as the GNC AMP® Creatine HCl 189™. In collaboration with The Hershey Company, products like Beyond Raw® LIT™ JOLLY RANCHER Grape pre-workout powder and on the-go have been produced which come in flavours like watermelon, green apple, and blue raspberry. Each pre-workout supplement contains clinically dosed ingredients, such as L-Citrulline, CarnoSyn betaalanine, micronized creatine, caffeine, and Nitrosigine. Other supplements like Burn MF Metabolic Activator Powder, Capsules, Sticks, and Drink belong to the Beyond Raw brand. Additionally, the text mentions that a new flavor, JOLLY RANCHER Grape, has been launched after the release of another supplement called Beyond Raw Concept X in May 2022. However, in a settlement with the Department of Justice, GNC, the largest retailer of supplements in the country, has agreed to pay $2.25 million. This settlement comes as part of a larger effort by the federal government to crack down on supplements that contain undisclosed drug ingredients, harmful compounds, or inaccurate ingredient labeling. As part of the settlement, GNC has committed to improving its product screening process and removing any supplements containing illegal or unsafe ingredients. In addition, the company will maintain a list of products that have been deemed safe for sale.

== Internal R&D Department ==
In recent years, GNC has faced challenges due to changing consumer preferences and increased competition in the health and wellness market. The company has responded by rebranding itself and focusing on digital sales and marketing. GNC collaborates with healthcare professionals, academic institutions and researchers worldwide to investigate various technologies, botanical extracts, and nutrients. They have a team of quality and research scientists Franchising Science Beyond Raw Internal R&D Department who conduct tests on nutritional ingredients sourced from different parts of the world. Additionally, GNC implements a "Truth in Labeling Policy", where their scientists, nutritionists and quality assurance professionals independently validate all the information stated on their product labels.

== Live Well Foundation philanthropy ==
In 2022, GNC Live Well Foundation partnered with Filmrise and director Nate Boyer to support his first film "MVP", while also holding a fundraising campaign for Boyer's nonprofit organization, Merging Vets & Players. The GNC Live Well Foundation is also the national sponsor for the film throughout the 2022-23 NFL season. With a stated mission to encourage and assist people in living well, the company has donated over $1 million to MVP in December 2020. This nonprofit organization was founded by Jay Glazer and Nate Boyer in 2015 in order to address the challenges that military veterans and retired athletes face when transitioning to civilian life. Starting from December 2020, the company has made a donation that exceeds $1 million to Merging Vets and Players (MVP). Jay Glazer, a Fox Sports NFL Insider, and Nate Boyer, a former green beret and Seattle Seahawk, established MVP in 2015. The goal of the non-profit organization is to tackle the difficulties that combat veterans and former professional athletes encounter as they transition to civilian life after leaving their respective professions. While the foundation aims to improve public health through its various initiatives, its association with GNC raises questions about its independence and the authenticity of its objectives.

Since its foundation, the charity has partnered with or raised money for other organizations and foundations such as the USA Track and Field Foundation, Operation Homefront, the National Breast Cancer Foundation, the American Red Cross, and the American Diabetes Association.

Critics argue that the foundation is a mere marketing tool used by GNC to promote its products and brand. This association could be seen as a strategy to attract customers who are looking for socially responsible businesses. Furthermore, some critics question the foundation's actual impact on public health. While the foundation claims to support research, education, and community programs that promote healthy living, there is little information about the specific initiatives it has supported or their impact. This lack of transparency raises concerns about the effectiveness and legitimacy of the foundation's activities. GNC has faced several lawsuits related to false or misleading claims about the efficacy of its products. The foundation's association with GNC raises questions about whether its initiatives are influenced by the company's profit motives rather than genuine concern for public health.

== Lawsuits ==
In 1998, GNC was accused of purposely running its franchisees out of business in order to "retake" the stores into corporate control. An April 30, 2003, article states that the GNC corporate company was sued by numerous franchise owners. The complaint is that the parent company was allowing their corporate owned stores to sell products for less than the franchise stores are allowed to sell them for. The suit also claimed that GNC charged high "reset fees" to franchisees when there is new signage that needs to be changed in the store or an image facelift that must be done by GNC corporate. A similar lawsuit was filed again in an article written on October 20, 2004.

In February 2015, New York Attorney General Eric Schneiderman sent cease and desist letters to GNC and other major retailers due to concerning laboratory tests regarding the accuracy of the claimed contents of supplements. GNC shortly afterwards removed some stock from sales while working with the Attorney General. In September 2016, GNC, the New York Office of the Attorney General, and other supplement retailers ultimately came to an agreement and retailers are now accomplishing more robust testing of supplements to ensure accurate labeling.

In October 2015, the Attorney General of Oregon filed a lawsuit against GNC alleging that the company knowingly sold products containing the ingredients picamilon and BMPEA, which are banned by the FDA.

On February 2, 2017, GNC threatened to sue the Fox Broadcasting Company for "significant economic and reputational damages, lost opportunities, and consequential damages", after an advertisement for the chain was blocked from airing during Super Bowl LI. Despite repeated approvals by Fox, the network stated that the ad had been vetoed by the National Football League because of GNC's placement on an NFLPA blacklist for selling products that contain substances banned by the NFL. The letter of intent claimed that Fox had not informed them of any such rules when they purchased the ad time, and cited that the purchase induced them to "spend millions of dollars in production costs and in the development of a national, coordinated marketing and rebranding campaign" around the commercial. The NFL itself does not prohibit ads for health stores unless they contain references to specific prohibited products; the GNC ad only contained motivational themes and no references to its products.
