= Panagiotis Pelekoudas =

Greek volleyball player (born 1989)

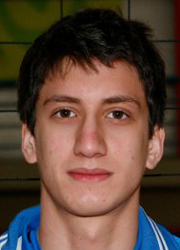

Personal information
- Nationality: Greek
- Born: 8 November 1989 (age 36); Patras, Greece
- Height: 202 cm (6 ft 8 in)
- Weight: 97 kg (214 lb)
- Spike: 348 cm (137 in)
- Block: 339 cm (133 in)

Volleyball information
- Position: Middle Blocker
- Current club: Pamvohaikos Vrahati

Career
Years	Teams
2006–2009; 2009–2010; 2010–2012; 2012–2013; 2013–2014; 2014–2015; 2015–2017; 2017–2018; 2018–2021; 2021–2022; 2022-2023	Panachaiki Patras; G.S. Lamia; Iraklis Thessaloniki; Porto Ravenna Volley; Foinikas Syros; Olympiacos Piraeus; Pamvohaikos Vrahati; PAOK Thessaloniki; Panathinaikos Athens; Kalamata 80; Pamvohaikos Vrahati

National team
Greece: > 60 caps
Honours
Men's volleyball
Representing Greece
European League
Silver medal – second place	2014 European League
Mediterranean Games
Bronze medal – third place	2018 Tarragona	Team
- Last updated: October 31, 2023

Panagiotis Pelekoudas (Greek: Παναγιώτης Πελεκούδας) (born 8 November 1989) is a Greek male volleyball player. He was part of the Greece men's national volleyball team.

== Sporting achievements ==
=== National team ===
- 2014 European League, with Greece National Team
- 2018 Mediterranean Games - Tarragona, with Greece National Team

=== Clubs ===
==== National Championships ====
- 2011/2012 Greek Championship, with Iraklis Thessaloniki
- 2019/2020 Greek Championship, with Panathinaikos Athens

==== National Cups ====
- 2011/2012 Greek Cup, with Iraklis Thessaloniki
- 2019/2018 Greek Cup, with P.A.O.K. Thessaloniki

==== National League Cups ====
- 2014/2015 Greek League Cup, with Olympiacos Piraeus
- 2019/2020 Greek League Cup, with Panathinaikos Athens

=== Individuals ===
- 2011/12 Hellenic Championship: 22nd day: MVP
- 2016/17 Hellenic Championship: 6th day: MVP
