= Andreas Andreadis =

Greek volleyball player (born 1982)

Personal information
- Nationality: Greek
- Born: 14 January 1982 (age 44); Provatonas, Evros, Greece
- Height: 205 cm (6 ft 9 in)
- Weight: 99 kg (218 lb)
- Spike: 340 cm (134 in)
- Block: 315 cm (124 in)

Volleyball information
- Position: Middle-blocker
- Current club: (Greece) OFI Heraklion
- Number: 10

Career
Years	Teams
1995–1997; 1997–2004; 2004–2009; 2009–2012; 2012–2013; 2013–2014; 2014–2015; 2015–2016; 2016; 2016–2017; 2017–2020; 2020–2021; 2021–2022; 2022–2023; 2023–2024; 2024–2025	(Greece) A.O. Tyhero (Greece) Ethnikos Alexandroupoli (Greece) Panathinaikos Athens (Greece) Olympiacos Piraeus (Greece) Iraklis Thessaloniki (Greece) Ethnikos Alexandroupoli (Greece) AEK Athens (Greece) Aris Thessaloniki (Greece) Foinikas Syros (Greece) PAOK Thessaloniki (Greece) Olympiacos Piraeus (Greece) AONS Milon (Greece) Olympiacos Piraeus (Greece) AONS Milon (Greece) Floisvos Palaio Faliro (Greece) OFI Heraklion

National team
1999–2017	Greece - 141 caps
- Last updated: April 16, 2025

Andreas Andreadis (born 14 January 1982) is a Greek volleyball player. He was part of the Greece men's national volleyball team at the 2006 FIVB Volleyball Men's World Championship in Japan. In the 2024–25 season he played for Greek club OFI Heraklion in Hellenic Volleyball League.

== Sporting achievements ==
=== Clubs ===
==== International competitions ====
- 2005/2006 CEV Top Teams Cup, with Panathinaikos Athens
- 2008/2009 CEV Cup, with Panathinaikos Athens
- 2017/2018 CEV Challenge Cup, with Olympiacos Piraeus

==== National Championships ====
- 2005/2006 Greek Championship, with Panathinaikos Athens
- 2009/2010 Greek Championship, with Olympiacos Piraeus
- 2010/2011 Greek Championship, with Olympiacos Piraeus
- 2016/2017 Greek Championship, with PAOK Thessaloniki
- 2017/2018 Greek Championship, with Olympiacos Piraeus
- 2018/2019 Greek Championship, with Olympiacos Piraeus
- 2020/2021 Greek Championship, with Olympiacos Piraeus

==== National Cups ====
- 2006/2007 Greek Cup, with Panathinaikos Athens
- 2007/2008 Greek Cup, with Panathinaikos Athens
- 2010/2011 Greek Cup, with Olympiacos Piraeus

==== National League Cups ====
- 2017/2018 Greek League Cup, with Olympiacos Piraeus
- 2018/2019 Greek League Cup, with Olympiacos Piraeus

==== Super Cups ====
- 2006 Greek Super Cup, with Panathinaikos Athens
- 2010 Greek Super Cup, with Olympiacos Piraeus

=== Individuals ===
- 2010/11 Hellenic Championship: Best central blocker
- 2021/22 Hellenic Championship: 13th day: MVP
