= Menelaos Kokkinakis =

Greek volleyball player (born 1993)

Personal information
- Nationality: Greek
- Born: 21 January 1993 (age 33); Athens, Greece
- Height: 190 cm (6 ft 3 in)
- Weight: 79 kg (174 lb)
- Spike: 315 cm (124 in)
- Block: 300 cm (118 in)

Volleyball information
- Current club: PAOK
- Number: 9 (national team)

Career
Years	Teams
2010–2017; 2017–2019; 2019–2020; 2020–	Olympiacos; Stade Poitevin Poitiers; Olympiacos; PAOK

National team
2011–	Greece

Menelaos Kokkinakis (Greek: Μενέλαος Κοκκινάκης; born 21 January 1993) is a Greek male volleyball player. He is part of the Greece men's national volleyball team. On club level he plays for PAOK.

== Honours ==
- Greek Championship (3)
  - 2011, 2013, 2014
- Greek Cup (7)
  - 2011, 2013, 2014, 2016, 2017, 2022, 2023
- Greek League Cup (4)
  - 2013, 2015, 2016, 2017
