= Konstantinos Stivachtis =

Greek volleyball player (born 1980)

Kostas Stivachtis

Personal information
- Full name: Konstantinos Stivachtis
- Nationality: Greek
- Born: 22 May 1980 (age 46); Athens, Greece
- Height: 186 cm (6 ft 1 in)
- Weight: 80 kg (176 lb)
- Spike: 305 cm (120 in)
- Block: 295 cm (116 in)

Volleyball information
- Position: Setter

Career
Years	Teams
1996–2003; 2003–2004; 2004–2005; 2005; 2005–2006; 2006–2007; 2007–2008; 2008–2010; 2010–2012; 2013; 2013–2015; 2015–2022; 2022–2024; 2024–2025	Ionikos Nea Filadelfeia; Pangrati; AONS Milon; A.E. Nikaia; Olympiacos Piraeus; Orestiada; Pangrati; AEK Athens; Pamvochaikos; New Mater; Panathinaikos; Olympiacos Piraeus; Kifissia; Floisvos Palaio Faliro

National team
2011–2021	Greece
Honours
Men's volleyball
Representing Greece
Mediterranean Games
Bronze medal – third place	2018 Tarragona	Team
European Silver League
Silver medal – second place	2019

Konstantinos Stivachtis (Greek: Κωνσταντίνος Στιβαχτής, born 22 May 1980) is a retired Greek male volleyball player. He used to be part of the Greece men's national volleyball team.

== Sporting achievements ==
=== International competitions ===
- 2017/2018 CEV Challenge Cup, with Olympiacos Piraeus (runner-up)

=== National championships ===
- 2016/2017 Greek Championship, with Olympiacos Piraeus
- 2017/2018 Greek Championship, with Olympiacos Piraeus
- 2018/2019 Greek Championship, with Olympiacos Piraeus
- 2019/2020 Greek Championship, with Olympiacos Piraeus
- 2020/2021 Greek Championship, with Olympiacos Piraeus
- 2021/2022 Greek Championship, with Olympiacos Piraeus

=== National Cups ===
- 2015/2016 Greek Cup, with Olympiacos Piraeus
- 2016/2017 Greek Cup, with Olympiacos Piraeus

=== National League Cups ===
- 2015/2016 Greek League Cup, with Olympiacos Piraeus
- 2016/2017 Greek League Cup, with Olympiacos Piraeus
- 2017/2018 Greek League Cup, with Olympiacos Piraeus
- 2018/2019 Greek League Cup, with Olympiacos Piraeus

=== Individually ===
- 2012: Hellenic Championship – Best setter
- 2021: Hellenic Championship – Most valuable player
