= 2011–12 Volleyleague (Greece) =

2011–12 Greek Volleyleague
- League: Greek Volley League
- Sport: Volleyball
- Teams: 12

Regular Season
- Season champions: Iraklis Thessaloniki
- Season MVP: (Greece) Andrej Kravárik
- Top scorer: (United States) Mark Dusharme 515 points

Finals
- Champions: Iraklis Thessaloniki
- Runners-up: Foinikas Syros

Greek Volleyleague seasons
- ← 2010–11 2012–13 →

The 2011–12 Greek Volleyleague season was the 44th season of the Greek Volleyleague, the highest tier professional volley league in Greece. The winner of the league was Iraklis Thessaloniki, which beat Foinikas Syros in the league's playoff's finals. The last match of the finals didn't held because Foinikas withdrew protested for a previous match. The clubs E.A. Patras and Apollon Kalamarias were relegated to the Greek A2 League. The championship finished with only 11 team because Apollon Kalamarias withdrew in the middle of season. The MVP of the league was Andrej Kravárik, player of Iraklis.

== Teams ==
Location of teams in Greek Volleyball League 2011-12

Club	Home city
Apollon Kalamarias	Thessaloniki
Aris Thessaloniki	Thessaloniki
E.A. Patras	Patras
Ethnikos Alexandroupolis	Alexandroupoli
Foinikas Syros	Ermoupolis
Iraklis	Thessaloniki
Kifissia	Kifissia, Athens
Lamia	Lamia
Olympiacos	Piraeus
Pamvohaikos	Vrachati
Panathinaikos	Athens
PAOK	Thessaloniki

== Regular season ==
Pos	Team	Pts	Pld	W	L	Set	
1	Iraklis Thessaloniki	50	20	18	2	55–18	3.06
2	Foinikas Syros	44	20	15	5	50–22	2.27
3	Olympiacos	43	20	14	6	50–23	2.17
4	Pamvohaikos	36	20	13	7	43–34	1.26
5	Lamia	27	20	9	11	36–43	0.84
6	Aris Thessaloniki	27	20	7	13	36–44	0.82
7	PAOK	27	20	10	10	37–42	0.88
8	Ethnikos Alexandroupolis	25	20	8	12	33–44	0.75
9	Kifissia	25	20	8	12	34–44	0.77
10	E.A. Patras	16	20	6	14	26–50	0.52
11	Panathinaikos	10	20	2	18	19–55	0.35
12	Apollon Kalamarias (withdrew)	0	9	1	8	7–25	0.28

Source: volleyleague.gr

== Play-out ==
tenth place
10	E.A. Patras	1
11	Panathinaikos	3

== Play-off (5-8) and (4-5) ==
Semifinals
5	Lamia	3
8	Ethnikos	1
6	Aris Thessaloniki	3
7	PAOK	2

Final
5	Lamia	0
6	Aris Thessaloniki	3

Fourth Place
3	Olympiacos	1
6	Aris Thessaloniki	3

== Play-off (1-4) ==
Semi finals
Iraklis Thessaloniki	2
Pamvohaikos	1
Foinikas Syros	2
Olympiacos	0

Finals
Iraklis Thessaloniki	3
Foinikas Syros	2
Third Place
Olympiacos	0
Pamvohaikos	2

== Final standings ==
Pos	Team
1	Iraklis Thessaloniki
2	Foinikas Syros
3	Pamvohaikos
4	Aris Thessaloniki
5	Olympiacos
6	Lamia
7	PAOK
8	Ethnikos Alexandroupolis
9	Kifissia
10	Panathinaikos
11	E.A. Patras
12	Apollon Kalamarias (withdrew)

== Awards ==
- Most valuable player
  (Greece) Andrej Kravárik (Iraklis Thessaloniki)
- Best setter
  (Greece) Konstantinos Stivachtis (Pamvohaikos)
- Best outside spikers
  (Slovenia) Jernej Potočnik (Pamvohaikos)
  (Greece) Konstantinos Christofidelis (Iraklis Thessaloniki)
- Best middle blockers
  (Greece) Dimitrios Soultanopoulos (Foinikas Syros)
  (Greece) Nikolaos Smaragdis (Iraklis Thessaloniki)
- Best opposite spiker
  (United States) Mark Dusharme (Pamvohaikos)
- Best libero
  (Greece) Georgios Stefanou (Iraklis Thessaloniki)
