= Giorgos Petreas =

Greek volleyball player (born 1986)

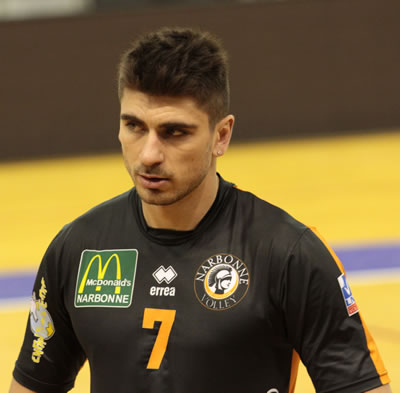

Personal information
- Nationality: Greek
- Born: 19 November 1986 (age 39); Kalamata, Greece
- Height: 2.02 m (6 ft 8 in)
- Weight: 92 kg (203 lb)
- Spike: 342 cm (135 in)
- Block: 320 cm (126 in)

Volleyball information
- Position: Middle Blocker
- Current club: Panionios
- Number: 7

Career
Years	Teams
2002–2005; 2005–2006; 2006–2007; 2007–2008; 2008–2010; 2010–2011; 2011–2012; 2012–2014; 2014–2017; 2017–2020; 2020–2021; 2021–2022; 2022–2025; 2025-2026; 2026	(Greece) GE Messinias (Greece) Aris Thessaloniki (Greece) PAOK Thessaloniki (Greece) Iraklis Thessaloniki (Greece) Aris Thessaloniki (Greece) Panathinaikos Athens (Greece) Olympiacos Piraeus (France) Narbonne Volley (France) Gazélec Ajaccio (Greece) Olympiacos Piraeus (France) Stade Poitevin Poitiers (Greece) PAOK Thessaloniki (Greece) Panathinaikos Athens (Greece) Milon (Greece) Panionios

National team
2008–	Greece (149)
Honours
Men's volleyball
Representing Greece
Mediterranean Games
Bronze medal – third place	2018 Tarragona	Team

Georgios Petreas (Greek: Γιώργος Πετρέας; born 19 November 1986, in Kalamata, Greece) is a Greek male volleyball player. He is the captain of the Greece men's national volleyball team. On club level he plays for Panionios

== Sporting achievements ==
=== National team ===
- 2018 Mediterranean Games (Tarragona, Spain)

=== Clubs ===
==== International competitions ====
- 2017/2018 CEV Challenge Cup, with Olympiacos Piraeus

==== National championships ====
- 2007/2008 Hellenic Championship, with Iraklis Thessaloniki
- 2017/2018 Hellenic Championship, with Olympiacos Piraeus
- 2018/2019 Hellenic Championship, with Olympiacos Piraeus
- 2019/2020 Hellenic Championship, with Olympiacos Piraeus
- 2024/2025 Hellenic Championship, with Panathinaikos

==== National Cups ====
- 2015/2016 French Cup, with Gazélec Ajaccio
- 2016/2017 French Cup, with Gazélec Ajaccio
- 2021/2022 Hellenic Cup, with P.A.O.K. Thessaloniki

==== National League Cups ====
- 2017/2018 Hellenic League Cup, with Olympiacos Piraeus
- 2018/2019 Hellenic League Cup, with Olympiacos Piraeus
- 2019/2020 Hellenic League Cup, with Olympiacos Piraeus
- 2021/2022 Hellenic League Cup, with P.A.O.K. Thessaloniki
- 2022/2023 Hellenic League Cup, with Panathinaikos Athens
- 2023/2024 Hellenic League Cup, with Panathinaikos Athens

==== National Super Cups ====
- 2007 Greek Super Cup, with Iraklis Thessaloniki
- 2016 French Super Cup, with Gazélec Ajaccio
- 2022 Greek Super Cup, with Panathinaikos Athens

=== Individually ===
- 2011 Hellenic Championship – Best blocker
- 2011 Hellenic Championship – Best middle blocker
- 2012 Hellenic Championship – Best blocker
- 2018 Hellenic Championship – Best middle blocker
- 2019 Hellenic Championship – Best middle blocker
- 2020 Hellenic Championship – Best middle blocker
