= Anestis Dalakouras =

Greek volleyball player (born 1993)

Personal information
- Nationality: Greek
- Born: 18 June 1993 (age 33); Alexandroupoli
- Height: 199 cm (6 ft 6 in)
- Weight: 92 kg (203 lb)
- Spike: 328 cm (129 in)
- Block: 307 cm (121 in)

Volleyball information
- Position: Outside hitter
- Current club: (Greece) Olympiacos Piraeus
- Number: 17

Career
Years	Teams
2006–2016	(Greece) Ethnikos Alexandroupolis
2016–2017	(Austria) SK Aich-Dob
2017–2018	(Greece) Pamvohaikos
2018–2019	(Greece) AE Komotini
2019–2020	(Germany) Helios Grizzlys Giesen
2020	(United Kingdom) IBB Polonia London
2020–2021	(Spain) FC Barcelona
2021–	(Greece) Olympiacos Piraeus

National team
2015–	Greece
Honours
Men's volleyball
Representing Greece
Mediterranean Games
Bronze medal – third place	2018 Tarragona	Team
European League
Silver medal – second place	2014
- Last updated: 7 April 2026

Anestis Dalakouras (born 18 June 1993) is a Greek international volleyball player, with the Greece men's national volleyball team. On club level he plays for Olympiacos Piraeus.

== Honours ==
=== National team ===
- 2014 European Volleyball League
- 2018 Mediterranean Games

=== Club ===
- CEV Challenge Cup
- 2022/2023, with Olympiacos Piraeus

National Championships

- 2022/2023 Hellenic Championship, with Olympiacos Praeus
- 2023/2024 Hellenic Championship, with Olympiacos Praeus
- 2024/2025 Hellenic Championship, with Olympiacos Praeus

National Cups

- 2023/2024 Hellenic Cup, with Olympiacos Praeus
- 2024/2025 Hellenic League Cup, with Olympiacos Piraeus
- 2024 Hellenic Super Cup
- 2024/2025 Hellenic Cup, with Olympiacos Piraeus
- 2025/2026 Hellenic League Cup, with Olympiacos Piraeus
- 2025 Hellenic Super Cup
