= Paraskevas Tselios =

Greek volleyball player (born 1997)

Personal information
- Nationality: Greek
- Born: 26 July 1997 (age 29); Alexandroupoli, Greece
- Height: 207 cm (6 ft 9 in)

Volleyball information
- Position: Middle blocker
- Current club: Retired

Career
| Years | Teams |
|---|---|
| 2012–2017; 2017-12.2018; 12.2018-2019; 2019–2020; 2020–2021; 2021–2022; 2022–2023; 2023–2024 | Ethnikos Alexandroupoli; Olympiacos Piraeus; Pamvohaikos Vrahati; O.F.I. Heraklion; VCA Amstetten NÖ; O.F.I. Heraklion; Aristotelis Skydra; Athlos Orestiada |

National team
| Greece |
- Last updated: 27 April 2026

Paraskevas Tselios (born 26 July 1997, in Alexandroupoli) is a retired Greek male volleyball player who played as a middle blocker. He used to be a member of the Greece men's national volleyball team and was part of the Greek team that competed at the 2017 FIVB Volleyball World League.

== Career ==
Paraskevas Tselios began his career with his hometown team, Ethnikos Alexandroupoli. In 2017, he moved to the powerful Olympiacos Piraeus, competing in the Hellenic Volleyball League. He then played for various teams, mainly in the Hellenic Volleyball League with Pamvohaikos Vrahati, O.F.I. Heraklion, Aristotelis Skydra, and in the Hellenic Pre-League (2nd level) with Athlos Orestiada. In the 2020–21 season, he played in the Austrian League with VCA Amstetten Niederösterreich.

Paraskevas Tselios won the Hellenic Championship and the Hellenic League Cup with Olympiacos Piraeus in the 2017–18 season, while he was runner-up in the Challenge Cup. With Ethniki Alexandroupolis he was runner-up in the Hellenic League Cup in 2015, and with VCA Amstetten he was runner-up in the Austrian Cup in 2021.

== Honours ==
=== Club ===
- 2017–18 CEV Challenge Cup, with Olympiacos Piraeus

National Championships

- 2017/2018 Hellenic Championship, with Olympiacos Piraeus

National Cups

- 2014/2015 Hellenic League Cup, with Ethnikos Alexandroupoli
- 2017/2018 Hellenic League Cup, with Olympiacos Piraeus
- 2020/2021 Austrian Cup, with VCA Amstetten NÖ
