= Dimitris Rizopoulos =

Greek volleyball player

Personal information
- Nationality: Greek
- Born: 26 August 1984 (age 42); Skotoussa, Serres, Greece
- Height: 2.02 cm (1 in)
- Weight: 91 kg (201 lb)
- Spike: 338 cm (133 in)
- Block: 327 cm (129 in)

Volleyball information
- Position: Outside spiker
- Current club: (Greece) Olympiacos Piraeus
- Number: 18

Career
| Years | Teams |
|---|---|
| 2002–2003; 2003–2005; 2005–2006; 2006–2007; 2007; 2008; 2008–2009; 2009–2010; 2010–2013; 2013–2014; 2014–2016; 2016–2017; 2018–2019; 2019– | (Greece) Aristotelis Skydras (Greece) Panellinios GS (Greece) GS Lamia (Greece) AONS Milon (Greece) Ethnikos Alexandroupolis (Greece) PAOK Thessaloniki (Greece) Foinikas Syros (Greece) GS Lamia (Greece) Aris Thessaloniki (Greece) GS Lamia (Greece) AC Orestiada (Greece) Iraklis Thessaloniki (Greece) Ethnikos Alexandroupolis (Greece) Olympiacos Piraeus |

Dimitris Rizopoulos (born 26 August 1984) is a Greek volleyball player, a member of the club Olympiacos CFP.

== Personal life ==
He was born in Skotoussa, Serres.

== Sporting achievements ==
=== National team ===
European League:

- 2006
