= Rafail Koumentakis =

Greek volleyball player (born 1993)

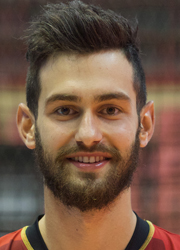

Personal information
- Nationality: Greek
- Born: 5 May 1993 (age 33); Thessaloniki, Greece
- Hometown: Alexandroupoli, Greece
- Height: 203 cm (6 ft 8 in)
- Weight: 84 kg (185 lb)
- Spike: 330 cm (130 in)
- Block: 310 cm (122 in)

Volleyball information
- Position: Outside Spiker
- Number: 10

Career
Years	Teams
2010–2013; 2013–2016; 2016–2017; 2017; 2017–2018; 2018–2020; 2020–2022; 2022–	Ethnikos Alexandroupolis; Bunge Ravenna; Cuprum Lubin; UGS Nantes Rezé; PAOK Thessaloniki; Olympiacos Piraeus; PAOK Thessaloniki; Olympiacos Piraeus

National team
2012–	Greece
Honours
Men's volleyball
Representing Greece
Balkan Youth championship
Gold medal – first place	2010 Kazanlak, Bulgaria
Balkan U21 championship
Silver medal – second place	2012 Zrenjanin, Serbia
European League
Silver medal – second place	2014
- Last updated: 6 April 2026

Rafail Koumentakis (Greek: Ραφαήλ Κουμεντάκης) (born 5 May 1993) is a Greek male volleyball player. He used to be part of the Greece men's national volleyball team.

== Honours ==
=== Club ===
- 2022–23 CEV Challenge Cup, with Olympiacos Piraeus

National Championships

- 2017/2018 Hellenic Championship, with P.A.O.K. V.C.
- 2018/2019 Hellenic Championship, with Olympiacos Piraeus
- 2019/2020 Hellenic Championship, with Olympiacos Piraeus
- 2022/2023 Hellenic Championship, with Olympiacos Piraeus
- 2023/2024 Hellenic Championship, with Olympiacos Piraeus
- 2024/2025 Hellenic Championship, with Olympiacos Piraeus

National Cups

- 2017/2018 Hellenic Cup, with PAOK Thessaloniki
- 2018/2019 Hellenic League Cup, with Olympiacos Piraeus
- 2019/2020 Hellenic League Cup, with Olympiacos Piraeus
- 2021/2022 Hellenic League Cup, with PAOK Thessaloniki
- 2021/2022 Hellenic Cup, with PAOK Thessaloniki
- 2022/2023 Hellenic League Cup, with Olympiacos Piraeus
- 2022/2023 Hellenic Cup, with Olympiacos Piraeus
- 2023 Hellenic Super Cup, with Olympiacos Piraeus
- 2023/2024 Hellenic Cup, with Olympiacos Piraeus
- 2024/2025 Hellenic League Cup, with Olympiacos Piraeus
- 2024 Hellenic Super Cup, with Olympiacos Piraeus
- 2024/2025 Hellenic Cup, with Olympiacos Piraeus
- 2025 Hellenic Super Cup, with Olympiacos Piraeus

=== National team ===
- 2012 U21 Balkan Cup
- 2014 European League

=== Individually ===
- 2018 Hellenic Cup – Most Valuable Player
- 2022 Hellenic Cup – Most Valuable Player
