= Nikos Samaras =

Greek volleyball player (1970–2013)

Nikolas Samaras
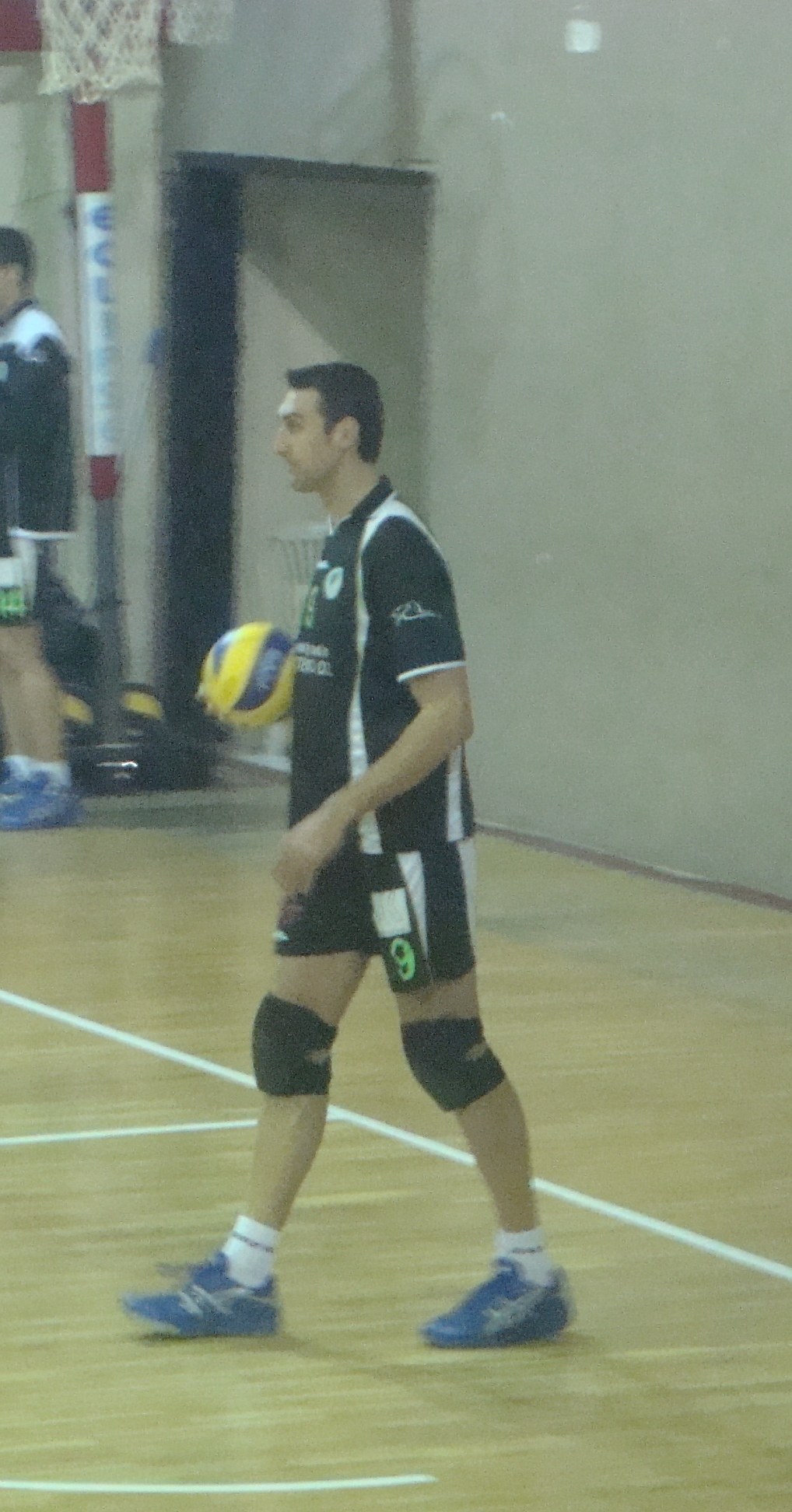

Personal information
- Nationality: Greek
- Born: 1 July 1970; Stuttgart, West Germany
- Died: 4 January 2013 (aged 43); Athens, Greece
- Height: 200 cm (6 ft 7 in)

Volleyball information
- Number: 9 (national team)

Career
Years	Teams
1988–1998; 1998–1999; 1999–2000; 2000–2002; 2002–2003; 2003–2004; 2004–2005; 2005–2006; 2006–2008; 2008–2010; 2010–2012; 2012–2013	(Greece) Orestiada (Italy) Sira Cucine Falconara (Greece) Iraklis Thessaloniki (Greece) Panathinaikos (Greece) AEK (Turkey) Fenerbahçe (Spain) Sevilla (Greece) Rethymno (Switzerland) Chênois (Greece) Ethnikos Alexandroupolis (Greece) Milon (Greece) Lemnos

National team
Greece

Nikos Samaras (1 July 1970 – 4 January 2013) was a Greek volleyball player, who competed for various Greek, Italian, Spanish and Turkish clubs.

Samaras was born in Stuttgart. He led Orestiada, helping the team to become successful in Greece and Europe. Many young people turned to volleyball in the 1990s because of him.

== Career stats ==
- 160 caps with the Greece Junior National Team
- 263 caps with the Greece National Team

== Honours ==
=== National team ===
- 1989 Junior World Championship - 6th place
- 1994 FIVB World Championship - 6th place

=== Clubs ===
- 1993 Greek Cup - Runner-up, with Orestiada
- 1993 Greek Championship - Runner-up, with Orestiada
- 1995 CEV Cup - Runner-up, with Orestiada
- 1997 Greek Championship - Runner-up, with Orestiada
- 1998 Greek Championship - Runner-up, with Orestiada
- 2000 Greek Cup - Champion, with Iraklis Thessaloniki
- 2004 Turkish Championship - Runner-up, with Fenerbahçe

== Death ==
Samaras died on Friday 4 January 2013, aged 42, after suffering a brain aneurysm.
