= 2012–13 Volleyleague (Greece) =

2012–13 Greek Volleyleague
- League: Greek Volley League
- Sport: Volleyball
- Teams: 12

Regular Season
- Season champions: Olympiacos
- Season MVP: (Bulgaria) Boyan Yordanov
- Top scorer: (Croatia) Ivan Raič 522 points

Finals
- Champions: Olympiacos 26th title
- Runners-up: Pamvohaikos

Greek Volleyleague seasons
- ← 2011–12 2013–14 →

The 2012−2013 Volleyleague is the 45th season of the Greek national volleyball league. Olympiacos was the winner beating Pamvochaikos in the finals. This was Olympiacos' 26th Championship. The teams that were relegated were Iraklis Thessaloniki (because of financial problems) and AONS Milon. The MVP of championship was awarded to Olympiacos' Boyan Yordanov.

== Teams ==
Locations of teams in the 2012−2013 Volleyleague

Team	City
Niki Aiginio	Aiginio
Aris Marmouris	Thessaloniki
Pamvochaikos	Vrachati
Ethnikos Alexandroupoli	Alexandroupoli
Kifissia AC	Athens
Iraklis Thessaloniki	Thessaloniki
AONS Milon	Athens
GS Lamia Achilleus	Lamia
Olympiacos	Piraeus
Panathinaikos	Athens
Foinikas Syros	Syros
PAOK Thessaloniki	Thessaloniki

== Regular season ==
Pos	Team	Pld	W	L	Pts	SW	SL	SR	SPW	SPL	SPR	Qualification or relegation
1	Olympiacos	22	20	2	56	60	19	3.158	1906	1640	1.162	Semifinals
2	Pamvochaikos	22	14	8	43	52	34	1.529	1964	1792	1.096	Semifinals
3	PAOK Thessaloniki	22	14	8	41	49	36	1.361	1905	1848	1.031	Semifinals
4	Ethnikos Alexandroupoli	22	15	7	41	53	37	1.432	2081	1963	1.060	Semifinals
5	Foinikas Syros	22	14	8	38 (Note: Foinikas Syros has −3 points from previous season)	49	35	1.400	1925	1812	1.062	5th to 8th place
6	Aris	22	11	11	34	45	42	1.071	1940	1950	0.995	5th to 8th place
7	Kifissia AC	22	11	11	31	41	42	0.976	1856	1837	1.010	5th to 8th place
8	GS Lamia Achilleus	22	8	14	29	40	47	0.851	1942	1941	1.001	5th to 8th place
9	Niki Aiginio	22	7	15	25	35	50	0.700	1848	1939	0.953	Play Out
10	Iraklis Thessaloniki	22	8	14	23 (Note: Iraklis Thessaloniki has −2 points from previous season)	34	50	0.680	1774	1890	0.939	Play Out
11	Panathinaikos	22	6	16	20	30	53	0.566	1770	1920	0.922	Play Out
12	AONS Milon	22	4	18	10	18	61	0.295	1500	1882	0.797	Relegation to A2 Ethniki

Source: http://www.volleyleague.gr/
Rules for classification: 1) head-to-head wins-losses, 2) head-to-head points, 3) head-to-head ratio sets, 4) head-to-head ratio points, 5) total wins-losses, if still equal play-off game

== Playoffs ==
=== Semifinals ===
==== (1) Olympiacos – (4) Ethnikos Alexandroupoli (3−0) ====
	Score		sets				
Olympiacos	3–1	Ethnikos Alexandroupoli	25−18	27−25	21−25	25−17	—
Olympiacos	3–0	Ethnikos Alexandroupoli	28−26	25−20	25−23	—	—
Ethnikos Alexandroupoli	0–3	Olympiacos	16−25	19−25	18−25	—	—

==== (2) Pamvochaikos – (3) PAOK Thessaloniki(3−0) ====
	Score		sets				
Pamvochaikos	3–2	PAOK Thessaloniki	22−25	25−22	25−21	20−25	16−14
Pamvochaikos	3–1	PAOK Thessaloniki	25−23	24−26	25−19	25−22	—
PAOK Thessaloniki	2–3	Pamvochaikos	25−16	24−26	26−24	21−25	8−15

=== Finals ===
==== (1) Olympiacos – (2) Pamvochaikos(3−1) ====
	Score		sets				
Olympiacos	0–3	Pamvochaikos	17−25	20−25	26−28	—	—
Olympiacos	3–0	Pamvochaikos	25−19	25−19	31−29	—	—
Pamvochaikos	0–3	Olympiacos	19−25	20−25	17−25	—	—
Pamvochaikos	0–3	Olympiacos	17−25	23−25	14−25	—	—

== Places 5–8 and Playout ==
=== Semifinals (5–8 places) ===
	Score		sets				
Foinikas Syros	3–2	Lamia	25−20	20−25	25−14	22−25	15−6
Aris	3–1	Kifissia	23−25	25−18	26−24	25−21	—

=== Final (5-6 places) ===
==== (5) Foinikas Syros – (6) Aris(2−0) ====
	Score		sets				
Aris	0–3	Foinikas Syros	22−25	22−25	19−25	—	—
Foinikas Syros	3–0	Aris	25−16	25−22	25−16	—	—

=== Play Out (9–11 places) ===
==== Final standings ====
Rnk	Club	P.	Mts	W	L	Sets
9	Niki Aiginiou	32	3	3	0	9–5
10	Iraklis ^{a}	26	2	1	1	4–3
11	Panathinaikos	22	3	0	3	4–9

== Final standings ==
Position	Team
1.	Olympiacos
2.	Pamvochaikos
3.	PAOK Thessaloniki
4.	Ethnikos Alexandroupoli
5.	Foinikas Syros
6.	Aris
7.	Kifissia AC
8.	GS Lamia Achilleus
9.	Niki Aiginiou
10.	Panathinaikos
11.	AONS Milon
12.	Iraklis ^{a}

Champions League
CEV Cup
Challenge Cup
BVA Cup
Relegation to A2 Ethniki

== Notes ==
^a Iraklis Thessaloniki was relegated to A2 division due to debts, after the decision of Greek sport court (ΑΣΕΑΔ).
