= Boyan Yordanov =

Bulgarian volleyball player (born 1983)

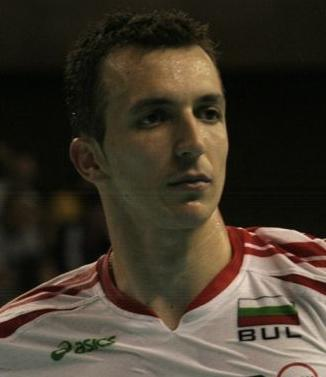

Personal information
- Born: 12 March 1983 (age 43)
- Height: 1.97 m (6 ft 6 in)
- Weight: 86 kg (190 lb)
- Spike: 358 cm (141 in)
- Block: 335 cm (132 in)

Volleyball information
- Position: Opposite
- Current team: Pafiakos Pafos

Career
Years	Teams
2002–2006; 2006–2008; 2008–2010; 2010–2011; 2011–2012; 2012–2015; 2015–2016; 2016; 2016–2017; 2017–2018; 2018–2019; 2019–2020; 2021–2022; 2022–2024; 2024–	(Bulgaria) Levski Sofia (Greece) Olympiacos Piraeus (Greece) E.A. Patras (Greece) Panathinaikos (Italy) Pallavolo Genova (Greece) Olympiacos Piraeus (Romania) Tomis Constanța (Bulgaria) Levski Sofia (Greece) Kifissia (Greece) Foinikas Syros (Greece) Panathinaikos (Slovenia) Calcit Kamnik (Bulgaria) Levski Sofia (Greece) Milon (Cyprus) Pafiakos Pafos

National team
2006–2018	Bulgaria
Honours
Men's volleyball
Representing Bulgaria
World Championship
Bronze medal – third place	2006 Japan	Team
FIVB World Cup
Bronze medal – third place	2007 Japan	Team

Boyan Yordanov (Bulgarian: Боян Йорданов, born 12 March 1983) is a Bulgarian volleyball player, member of the Bulgaria men's national volleyball team. Boyan started his career in Levski (Siconco) Sofia. He made his first cap for Bulgaria in a match against France on the 2006 World Championship in Osaka. He entered as a sub in the third game with France leading 2:0. At the end, Bulgaria won 3:2. Bulgaria got to the bronze medals on the same WC. He has got a silver medal from the 2003 U-21 World Championship in Iran as well.

== Sporting achievements ==
=== Club ===
==== National Championships ====
- 2002/2003 Bulgarian Championship with Levski Sofia
- 2003/2004 Bulgarian Championship with Levski Sofia
- 2004/2005 Bulgarian Championship with Levski Sofia
- 2005/2006 Bulgarian Championship with Levski Sofia
- 2012/2013 Greek Championship with Olympiacos
- 2013/2014 Greek Championship with Olympiacos

==== National Cups ====
- 2001/2002 Bulgarian Cup, with Levski Sofia
- 2002/2003 Bulgarian Cup, with Levski Sofia
- 2004/2005 Bulgarian Cup, with Levski Sofia
- 2005/2006 Bulgarian Cup, with Levski Sofia
- 2012/2013 Greek Cup, with Olympiacos
- 2013/2014 Greek Cup, with Olympiacos

==== National League Cups ====
- 2012/2013 Greek League Cup, with Olympiacos
- 2014/2015 Greek League Cup, with Olympiacos

=== Individually ===
- 2012-13 Greek Championship MVP
- 2013 Final four Greek Cup MVP
- 2014 Final four Greek Cup MVP
- 2013-14 Greek Championship Top scorer
- 2016-17 Greek Championship Top scorer
- 2016-17 Greek Championship Best Opposite
