= 2010–11 Volleyleague (Greece) =

2010–11 Greek Volleyleague
- League: Greek Volley League
- Sport: Volleyball
- Teams: 12

Regular Season
- Season champions: Iraklis Thessaloniki
- Season MVP: (Cuba) Rolando Jurquin
- Top scorer: (Greece) Mitar Tzourits 538 points

Finals
- Champions: Olympiacos 25th title
- Runners-up: Iraklis Thessaloniki

Greek Volleyleague seasons
- ← 2009–10 2011–12 →

The 2010−11 Volleyleague is the 43rd season of the Greek national volleyball league.

== Teams ==
Team	City
Apollon Kalamaria	Thessaloniki
Aris Marmouris	Thessaloniki
E.A. Patras Lux	Patras
Ethnikos Alexandroupoli	Alexandroupoli
Epikouros ISS	Thessaloniki
Iraklis Thessaloniki	Thessaloniki
Kifissia AC	Athens
GS Lamia Achilleus	Lamia
Olympiacos	Piraeus
Panathinaikos	Athens
Panellinios	Athens
PAOK Thessaloniki	Thessaloniki

== Regular season ==
Pos	Team	Pld	W	L	Pts	SW	SL	SR	SPW	SPL	SPR	Qualification or relegation
1	Iraklis Thessaloniki	22	17	5	52	58	25	2.320	1956	1754	1.115	Semifinals
2	Olympiacos	22	16	6	48	56	27	2.074	1960	1798	1.090	Semifinals
3	Panathinaikos	22	16	6	47	54	28	1.929	1919	1736	1.105	Semifinals
4	PAOK Thessaloniki	22	17	5	46	52	29	1.793	1885	1753	1.075	Semifinals
5	E.A. Patras Lux	22	14	8	42	52	36	1.444	2009	1897	1.059	
6	GS Lamia Achilleus	22	13	9	38	47	37	1.270	1933	1877	1.030	
7	Aris Marmouris	22	9	13	30	39	45	0.867	1864	1887	0.988	
8	Kifissia AC	22	9	13	29	40	48	0.833	1933	2009	0.962	
9	Ethnikos Alexandroupoli	22	7	15	21	28	53	0.528	1731	1907	0.908	
10	Apollon Kalamaria	22	6	16	20	29	55	0.527	1743	1932	0.902	
11	Epikouros ISS	22	6	16	17	30	54	0.556	1870	1958	0.955	Relegation to A2 Ethniki
12	Panellinios	22	2	20	6	12	60	0.200	1498	1793	0.835	Relegation to A2 Ethniki

== Playoffs ==
=== Semifinals ===
==== (1) Iraklis Thessaloniki vs (4) PAOK Thessaloniki (series 2−0) ====
Date	Time		Score		Set 1	Set 2	Set 3	Set 4	Set 5	Total
6 Apr	18:00	Iraklis Thessaloniki	3–2	PAOK Thessaloniki	15–25	25–17	22–25	25−20	15−10	102–97
9 Apr	19:30	PAOK Thessaloniki	0–3	Iraklis Thessaloniki	23–25	20–25	16–25			59–75

==== (2) Olympiacos vs (3) Panathinaikos (series 2−0) ====
Date	Time		Score		Set 1	Set 2	Set 3	Set 4	Set 5	Total
6 Apr	20:00	Olympiacos	3–2	Panathinaikos	25–27	21–25	25–15	25−19	15−12	111–98
9 Apr	17:00	Panathinaikos	2–3	Olympiacos	25–18	25–20	17–25	19−25	14−16	100–104

=== Finals ===
==== (1) Iraklis Thessaloniki vs (2) Olympiacos (series 0−3) ====
Date	Time		Score		Set 1	Set 2	Set 3	Set 4	Set 5	Total
27 Apr	19:00	Iraklis Thessaloniki	2–3	Olympiacos	25–17	21–25	18–25	30−28	10−15	104–110
29 Apr	18:00	Iraklis Thessaloniki	0–3	Olympiacos	17–25	23–25	33–35			73–85
2 May	19:00	Olympiacos	3–0	Iraklis Thessaloniki	25–21	26–24	25–19			76–64

== Final standings ==
Position	Team
1.	Olympiacos
2.	Iraklis Thessaloniki
3.	Panathinaikos
4.	PAOK Thessaloniki
5.	E.A. Patras Lux
6.	GS Lamia Achilleus
7.	Aris Marmouris
8.	Kifissia AC
9.	Ethnikos Alexandroupolis
10.	Apollon Kalamaria
11.	Epikouros ISS
12.	Panellinios

Champions League
CEV Cup
Challenge Cup
BVA Cup
Relegation to A2 Ethniki

== Awards ==
- Most valuable player
  (Cuba) Rolando Jurquin (Olympiacos)
- Best setter
  (Greece) Dmytro Filippov (Olympiacos)
- Best outside spikers
  (Cuba) Rolando Jurquin (Olympiacos)
  (Montenegro) Marko Bojić (PAOK)
- Best middle blockers
  (Greece) Andreas Andreadis (Olympiacos)
  (Greece) Giorgos Petreas (Panathinaikos)
- Best opposite spiker
  (Greece) Mitar Tzourits (Olympiacos)
- Best libero
  (Serbia) Marko Samardžić (Aris Thessaloniki)
