= 2013–14 Volleyleague (Greece) =

2013–14 Greek Volleyleague
- League: Greek Volley League
- Sport: Volleyball
- Teams: 12

Regular Season
- Season champions: Olympiacos
- Season MVP: (Greece) Kostas Christofidelis
- Top scorer: (Croatia) Ivan Raič 536 points

Finals
- Champions: Olympiacos 27th title
- Runners-up: Ethnikos Alexandroupolis

Greek Volleyleague seasons
- ← 2012–13 2014–15 →

The 2013–14 Greek Volleyleague season was the 46th season of the Greek Volleyleague, the highest tier professional volley league in Greece. The winner of the league was Olympiacos, which beat Ethnikos Alexandroupolis in the league's playoff's finals. The clubs Panachaiki and Niki Aiginio were relegated to the Greek A2 League. The MVP of the league was Kostas Christofidelis, player of Olympiacos.

== Teams ==
Location of teams in Greek Volleyball League 2013-14

| Club | Home city |
|---|---|
| AEK Athens | Athens |
| Aris Thessaloniki | Thessaloniki |
| Ethnikos Alexandroupolis | Alexandroupoli |
| Foinikas Syros | Ermoupolis |
| Kifissia | Kifissia, Athens |
| Lamia | Lamia |
| Niki Aiginio | Aiginio |
| Olympiacos | Piraeus |
| Pamvohaikos | Vrachati |
| Panachaiki | Patras |
| Panathinaikos | Athens |
| PAOK | Thessaloniki |

== Regular season ==
| Pos | Team | Pts | Pld | W | L | Set | | Result |
|---|---|---|---|---|---|---|---|---|
| 1 | Olympiacos | 52 | 22 | 17 | 5 | 58–25 | 2,32 | Play-off (1-4) |
| 2 | Kifissia | 50 | 22 | 16 | 6 | 57–27 | 2,11 | Play-off (1-4) |
| 3 | Ethnikos Alexandroupolis | 48 | 22 | 16 | 6 | 55–31 | 1,77 | Play-off (1-4) |
| 4 | Foinikas Syros | 48 | 22 | 17 | 5 | 57–27 | 2,11 | Play-off (1-4) |
| 5 | AEK | 38 | 22 | 12 | 10 | 47–39 | 1,21 | Play-off (5-8) |
| 6 | Lamia | 29 | 22 | 10 | 12 | 36–45 | 0,80 | Play-off (5-8) |
| 7 | PAOK | 29 | 22 | 9 | 13 | 42–49 | 0,86 | Play-off (5-8) |
| 8 | Pamvohaikos | 23 | 22 | 8 | 14 | 36–53 | 0,68 | Play-off (5-8) |
| 9 | Panathinaikos | 23 | 22 | 8 | 14 | 31–48 | 0,65 | Play out |
| 10 | Aris Thessaloniki | 22 | 22 | 6 | 16 | 34–54 | 0,63 | Play out |
| 11 | Panachaiki | 17 | 22 | 6 | 16 | 30–57 | 0,53 | Play out |
| 12 | Niki Aiginio | 17 | 22 | 7 | 15 | 27–55 | 0,49 | Play out |

Source: volleyleague.gr

== Play-out ==
| Pos | Team | Pts | Pld | W | L | Set |
|---|---|---|---|---|---|---|
| 1 | Aris Thessaloniki | 32 | 5 | 3 | 2 | 12–9 |
| 2 | Panathinaikos | 31 | 5 | 3 | 2 | 11–10 |
| 3 | Panachaiki | 28 | 5 | 4 | 1 | 13–8 |
| 4 | Niki Aiginio | 18 | 5 | 0 | 5 | 6–15 |

- 6th match didn't need

== Play-off (5-8) ==
Semifinals
5 | AEK | 2
8 | Pamvohaikos | 3
6 | Lamia | 0
7 | PAOK | 3

Finals
7 | PAOK | 0
8 | Pamvohaikos | 2

== Play-off (1-4) ==
Semifinals
1 | Olympiacos | 3
4 | Foinikas Syros | 2
2 | Kifissia | 0
3 | Ethnikos | 3

Finals
1 | Olympiacos | 3
3 | Ethnikos | 0

== Final standings ==
| Pos | Team |
|---|---|
| 1 | Olympiacos |
| 2 | Ethnikos Alexandroupolis |
| 3 | Kifissia |
| 4 | Foinikas Syros |
| 5 | Pamvohaikos |
| 6 | PAOK |
| 7 | AEK |
| 8 | Lamia |
| 9 | Aris Thessaloniki |
| 10 | Panathinaikos |
| 11 | Panachaiki |
| 12 | Niki Aiginio |
