= Rolando Jurquin =

Cuban volleyball player (born 1987)

Rolando Despaigne
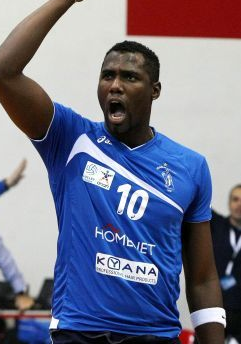

Personal information
- Born: June 7, 1987 (age 39)

Volleyball information
- Position: Wing Spiker

Career
Teams
| | (Cuba) Orientales de Santiago (Greece) Olympiacos (Greece) Iraklis (Brazil) Medley/Campinas (Brazil) Funvic Taubaté (Italy) Pallavolo Molfetta |
Honours
Men's volleyball
Representing Cuba
Pan American Games
| Bronze medal – third place | 2007 Rio de Janeiro | Team |
America's Cup
| Bronze medal – third place | 2007 Manaus | Team |
NORCECA Championship
| Bronze medal – third place | 2007 Anaheim | Team |

Rolando Jurquin Despaigne (born June 7, 1987) is a Cuban volleyball player, who plays as a wing-spiker. He was a member of the national squad of Cuba that claimed the bronze medal at the 2007 Pan American Games in Rio de Janeiro, Brazil.

== Sporting achievements ==
=== Club ===
==== National Championships ====
- 2010/2011 Hellenic Championship with Olympiacos
- 2011/2012 Hellenic Championship with Iraklis

==== National Cups ====
- 2010/2011 Hellenic Cup, with Olympiacos
- 2011/2012 Hellenic Cup, with Iraklis

=== Individually ===
- 2011 Hellenic Cup – Most valuable player
- 2011 Hellenic Championship – Most valuable player
- 2011 Hellenic Championship – Best outside spiker
- 2012 Hellenic Cup – Most valuable player
