= Hellenic Volleyball Federation =

Governing body of volleyball in Greece

- Sport: Volleyball
- Jurisdiction: Greece
- Abbreviation: EOΠΕ
- Founded: 1970
- Affiliation: FIVB
- Regional affiliation: CEV
- President: Giorgos Karabetsos

Official website
- www.volleyball.gr
- (Greece)

The Hellenic Volleyball Federation (Greek: Ελληνική Ομοσπονδία Πετοσφαίρισης, abbreviated as Ε.Ο.ΠΕ.), is a governing body for volleyball and beach volleyball in Greece. The organization oversees the A1 Ethniki Volleyball league, the Greek Volleyball Cup, the Greek Volleyball League Cup, the Greek Volleyball Super Cup, such as the women's competitions.

== Honours ==
=== Men's National Team ===
- Men's European Volleyball Championship

- Third (1): 1987

- Men's European Volleyball League

- Runners-up (1): 2014

== See also ==
- Greece men's national volleyball team
- A1 Ethniki Volleyball
- Greek Volleyball Cup
