= Ethnikos Alexandroupolis V.C. =

Volleyball department of a Greek multi-sport club

Ethnikos Alexandroupolis Εθνικός Αλεξανδρούπολης
- Full name: Mousikos Gymnastikos Syllogos Ethnikos Alexandroupolis (Music and Gymnastics Club Ethnikos Alexandroupolis)
- Founded: 1927
- Ground: Alexandroupoli Municipal Gym (Capacity: 1,000)
- Manager: Thanassis Moustakidis
- League: A1 Division; CEV Challenge Cup
- 2018-19: 9th

Uniforms
| Home | Away |

Ethnikos Alexandroupolis Volleyball Club is the volleyball department of Ethnikos Alexandroupolis multi-sport club that based in Alexandroupoli, Greece. It plays almost constantly in A1 Greek Volleyleague and it is the most consistent club (42 participations) in the Greek league except Athens and Thessaloniki. Its colours are blue and white and its home is the Closed Gym of Alexandroupoli 'Michalis Paraskevopoulos' (capacity: 1000 seats).

== History ==
Ethnikos Alexandroupolis was founded in 1927 as a music and sport club. In 1937 it was dissolved. In 1947, it was refounded again after the Second World War. It developed sport sections in football, basketball, volleyball, table tennis and track and field. The most successful section is the volleyball team that has an almost constant presence in the first division (A1 Ethniki). It is the first provincial (except Thessaloniki and Athens) volleyball club in appearances in the Greek Volleyball Championship and one of the most successful in Greek Volleyball in terms of dynamics (8 times in the first 4 teams of the championship), discrimination and many players who have emerged from the club making a huge career in Greek and world Volleyball (e.g. Giourdas, Koumentakis, Andreadis, Baev). Traditionally the playing trunk group based on home-grown players and for this reason Alexandroupolis and Evros considered the "metropolis of the Greek volleyball", because volleyball players from Evros staff for years all national volleyball teams of Greece.

=== 1970s ===
In the 1970s the team had a good presence occupying high positions in the league (4th in the seasons 1974–1975, 1975–1976, 1976–1977, 3rd in 1977–1978). In the 1978–79 season Ethnikos Alexandroupolis played for the first time in Europe in the CEV Cup Winner's Cup against the Turkish team Vinilex Istanbul (professional team, first in Turkey), from which lost in both matches 3–0.

=== 1980s ===
In 1980–81 the team of Ethnikos Alexandroupolis competed in the Greek Cup final and the same year in European competitions.

In the 1981–82 season, Ethnikos Alexandroupolis ranked in fourth place in the Greek League and competed the following year (1982–83) in the CEV Cup against Portuguese team Espinio, which was ruled out by a single point, as the teams' home games had exactly the same result, 3–0 sets.

In 1982–83, the team was fourth in the league and competed for the CEV Cup the following year (1983–84) versus the powerful team Panini Modena of Italy (Italian champion for many years, later with a different name) which also won the title of that year. Ethnikos was excluded after losing in both games 3–0 sets.

In 1983–84, the Alexandroupoli's team was ranked sixth in the championship and participated the following year (1984–85) in the Balkan Volleyball Cup that held in Constantinople. Ethnikos ranked fourth, with participation of teams from all (then) Balkan countries.

=== 1990s, 2000s ===
Then, there was a period with renewal of the team players, resulting many playing transitions. After the mid-90s, the team recovered with foreign players additions, as imposed by the conditions of the era, was able to present a good playing presence.

=== 2010s ===
Ethnikos Alexandroupolis played again in the European competitions in the autumn of 2013, after 30 years, finishing 4th at 2012–13 Volleyleague and competing in the 2013-14 CEV Cup, from which was eliminated in the phase of 32 by Polish PGE Skra Bełchatów with two defeats (3–1, 3–0). He continued in the 2013–14 CEV Challenge Cup of the same season, playing totally 6 European games that year, winning two (3–1, 2–3), even qualifying against the Belarusian Kommunalnik Grodno. Ethnikos was eliminated by Belgian Euphony Asse-Lennik in the phase of 16 in the golden set (3–0, 3–1, 15–12).

The most successful season of the club was in 2013–14 during it won the unofficial title of winter champions (first in Greek league standings until December) and then Alexandroupoli's team played in the playoff finals of the championship against Olympiacos, finishing in 2nd place. This season won the participation in the 2014–15 CEV Challenge Cup, reaching the quarterfinals.

During the 2014–15 season the team participated in European competitions through the 2014–15 CEV Challenge Cup and reached the quarter-finals excluding in a raw: the Swiss team TV Schönenwerd, Estonian Selver Tallinn and Czech Fatra Zlín. He was eliminated in the quarterfinals by that year's finalist S.L. Benfica with two defeats (3–0, 2–3). In the Greek competitions, Ethnikos Alexandroupolis reached the final of the League Cup, that lost from Olympiacos, 3–1 sets. He finished sixth in the Greek Championship, but won the right to compete in Europe for the following season (2015–16), as Panathinaikos and Kifissia, who finished 4th and 5th respectively, declined to participate in European tournaments, so the team from Thrace took their place.

In the 2015–16 season the team reached the 2015–16 CEV Challenge Cup quarterfinals for the second consecutive year representing Greece, and was eliminated by the same opponent, Portuguese S.L. Benfica, again with two defeats (3–1, 2–3). Previously, the Evros's team had excluded Slovenian Panvita Pomgrad, Slovak VK Prievidza and Serbian Spartak Ljig. The team ranked 7th in the Championship, as was the 2016–17 season.

In 2017–18, Ethnikos Alexandroupolis arrives for the second time in his history tο the final of the Greek League Cup, when again defeated by Olympiacos, 3–0. The team from Thrace finishes 9th in Greek championship as well as in the next season 2018–19, avoiding relegation both 2 years in play out.

The coach of the team from 2012–13 until 2018–19 was the appearances record holder (413 appearances) of Greek National Volleyball team, Thanassis Moustakidis.

== Rankings of Ethnikos Alexandroupolis in A1 Greek Volleyleague ==
| Season | Place | Honours |
|---|---|---|
| 1970–71 | 11th | |
| 1971–72 | 7th | |
| 1972–73 | 8th | |
| 1973–74 | 6th | |
| 1974–75 | 4th | |
| 1975–76 | 4th | |
| 1976–77 | 4th | |
| 1977–78 | 3rd | |
| 1978–79 | 7th | |
| 1979–80 | 6th | |
| 1980–81 | 5th | Finalist of Greek Cup |
| 1981–82 | 4th | |
| 1982–83 | 4th | |
| 1983–84 | 6th | |
| 1984–85 | 7th | 4th in Balkan Volleyball Cup |
| 1985–86 | 9th | |
| 1986–87 | 11th | |
| 1989–90 | 9th | |
| 1991–92 | 7th | |
| 1992–93 | 5th | |
| 1993–94 | 9th | |
| 1994–95 | 9th | |
| 1995–96 | 7th | |
| 1996–97 | 7th | |
| 1997–98 | 12th | |
| 2002–03 | 7th | |
| 2003–04 | 7th | |
| 2004–05 | 10th | |
| 2005–06 | 10th | |
| 2006–07 | 10th | |
| 2007–08 | 9th | |
| 2008–09 | 12th | |
| 2010–11 | 9th | |
| 2011–12 | 8th | |
| 2012–13 | 4th | |
| 2013–14 | 2nd | 16th Finals in CEV Cup 8th Finals in CEV Challenge Cup Finalist Play off Championship |
| 2014–15 | 6th | Finalist League Cup Quarterfinals CEV Challenge Cup |
| 2015–16 | 7th | Quarterfinals CEV Challenge Cup |
| 2016–17 | 7th | |
| 2017–18 | 9th | Finalist League Cup |
| 2018–19 | 9th | |
| 2019–20 | 10th | |

== International team's volleyball players and honours with Greek national volleyball teams ==
Honours of Ethnikos's international players
| Name | Honour | Year |
|---|---|---|
| Athanasios Kasampalis | 3rd Youth Balkan winner | 1975 |
| Ioannis Christouilias | 6th Youth European winner | 1976 |
| Giorgos Tektonidis | 3rd Men Mediterranean winner | 1979 |
| Theodoros Siglidis | 2nd Youth Balkan winner | 1984 |
| Eleftherios Terzakis | Men Balkan Champion | 1985 |
| Anestis Giannakopoulos | 3rd Youth Balkan winner | 1985 |
| Stefanos Mitrakas | 6th Youth World champion | 1993 |
| Christos Kitsios | 6th Youth World champion | 1996 |
| Theodoros Baev | 7th Youth World champion | 1996 |
| Dimitrios Zlatilidis | 2nd Junior World champion | 1997 |

== Honours ==
=== Men's Team Honours ===
- Greek Volleyball Championship
  - Finalist (1): 2014
- Greek Volleyball Cup
  - Finalist (1): 1981
- Greek Volleyball League Cup
  - Finalist (2): 2015, 2018

=== Academy's Honours ===
- 6 Greek U21 Volleyball Championships (1976, 1987, 2011, 2012, 2013, 2023)
- 2 Greek U18 Volleyball Championships (2008, 2011)
- 3 Greek U16 Volleyball Championships (2007, 2008, 2009)

=== European ===
- CEV Challenge Cup
  - Quarter-finals (2): 2014–15, 2015–16

== Current squad ==
2016–2017 roster

| Shirt No | Player | Height | Position |
| 1 | (Greece) Dimitris Mouchlias | 1.96 | Opposite |
| 2 | (Greece) Giannis Kavaratzis | 1.95 | Opposite |
| 3 | (Greece) Kostas Vlachopoulos | 1.93 | Setter |
| 4 | (Brazil) Juarez Gomes Leal Junior | 1.96 | Outside hitter |
| 5 | (Greece) Dimitris Chatzopoulos | 2.01 | Middle blocker |
| 6 | (Colombia) Daniel Vanegas | 1.95 | Outside hitter |
| 7 | (Greece) Sokratis Charalampidis | 1.98 | Outside hitter |
| 8 | (Greece) Giannis Charitonidis | 1.85 | Setter |
| 10 | (Greece) Dimitris Miros | 1.83 | Libero |
| 11 | (Greece) Achilleas Andravizos | 1.94 | Outside hitter |
| 12 | (Greece) Kassandros Stiggas | 2.00 | Middle blocker |
| 13 | (Greece) Nikolaos Palentzas | 1.98 | Opposite |
| 14 | (Greece) Paraskevas Tselios | 2.07 | Middle blocker |
| 15 | (Greece) Achilleas Konstantinidis | 1.87 | Outside hitter |
| 16 | (Greece) Vasilis Stoiloudis | 2.00 | Middle blocker |
| 17 | (Greece) Marios Papazoglou | 1.87 | Setter |
| 20 | (Greece) Grigoris Kontostathis | 1.90 | Libero |

=== Technical and managerial staff ===
| Job | Name |
| Head Coach | (Greece) Thanassis Moustakidis |

== Notable players ==
- (Greece) Thanassis Moustakidis
- (Greece) Nikos Samaras
- (Bulgaria) (Greece) Theodoros Baev
- (Czech Republic) (Greece) Andrej Kravárik
- (Greece) Marios Giourdas
- (Greece) Andreas Andreadis
- (Greece) Rafail Koumentakis
- (Greece) Anestis Dalakouras
- (Greece) Paraskevas Tselios

== Sponsorships ==
- Great Sponsor: Joker
- Official Sponsors: Vodafone, Green Oil EMO, Casino Thraki

== See also ==
- Alexandroupoli
- Ethnikos Alexandroupoli F.C.
