= Theodoros Baev =

Bulgarian-Greek volleyball player

Zlatkov Bayev

Personal information
- Nationality: Bulgarian / Greek
- Born: 31 May 1977 (age 49); Nova Zagora, Bulgaria
- Height: 200 cm (6 ft 7 in)
- Weight: 95 kg (209 lb)
- Spike: 340 cm (134 in)
- Block: 333 cm (131 in)

Career
Years	Teams
1993–1994; 1994–1997; 1997–2001; 2001–2005; 2005–2007; 2007–2008; 2008–2009	Lokomotiv Plovdiv; Ethnikos Alexandroupolis; Orestiada; Iraklis; Panathinaikos; Al Ahly; Halkbank Ankara

National team
1995–2009	Greece (187)

Theodoros Baev (Bulgarian: Теодорос Баев, Greek: Θεόδωρος Μπάεφ; born 31 May, 1977) also written as Zlatkov Bayev and Tontor-Zlatko Baev, is a Bulgarian-born Greek retired volleyball player.

Baev was born in Nova Zagora, Bulgaria. From the beginning of his career in Greek championship as a player of Ethnikos Alexandroupolis (1994–1997), Todor Baev was the focal point of federal coaches' interest.

He first joined the juniors' National Team in 1994 and took 5th place at the European Championship in Turkey. A turning point in his career was the juniors' World Championship of Malaysia in 1995, where the National Team won 5th place and Baev was declared the best attacker of the event.

Before entering the men's National Team he experienced two more great successes. In 1996 at the European Championship in Israel and in 1997 at the World Championship in Bahrain, Baev led the juniors' National Team both times to 5th place.

His first formal match as a player of the men's National Team was in 1995 at the European Championship in Athens where he played as a substitute in the game against Latvia (Greece won 3-0 sets). He gained his first points (2 points + 3 side outs) in the match against Poland where Greece was defeated 3-0 sets. He has 93 international participations to his credit (until 2002), while one of his greatest achievements as a player of the National Team was the 7th-place finish at the World Championship in Argentina in 2002. Generally, Argentina is Baev's lucky charm since he showed great performances there; in the World League (1998) the Greek men's National Team achieved two wins 3-2 and 3-1 sets at Santa Fe and Rosario respectively in the presence of 8000 Argentines.

As an international player he has participated once in the World Championship (2002-Argentina: 7th place), once in the European Championship (1995-Athens: 7th place) and three times in the World Leagues (1998: 12th place, 2001: 9th, 2002: 9th).
