= Nikolaos Palentzas =

Greek volleyball player (born 1991)

Personal information
- Nationality: Greek
- Born: 6 April 1991 (age 35); Thessaloniki
- Height: 198 cm (6 ft 6 in)
- Weight: 88 kg (194 lb)
- Spike: 315 cm (124 in)
- Block: 305 cm (120 in)

Volleyball information
- Number: 19 (national team)

Career
Years	Teams
2015	Iraklis V.C.

National team
2015	Greece

Nikolaos Palentzas (born 6 April 1991) is a Greek male volleyball player. He is part of the Greece men's national volleyball team. On the club level he plays for Iraklis Thessaloniki V.C.
