= Dimitrios Soultanopoulos =

Greek volleyball player

Dimitris Soultanopoulos

Personal information
- Full name: Dimitrios Soultanopoulos
- Nationality: Greece
- Born: 3 September 1981 (age 45); Athens, Greece
- Height: 200 cm (6 ft 7 in)
- Weight: 90 kg (198 lb)
- Spike: 320 cm (126 in)
- Block: 310 cm (122 in)

Volleyball information
- Position: Middle blocker

Career
Years	Teams
1996–2001; 2001–2002; 2002–2003; 2003–2004; 2004–2006; 2006–2010; 2010–2011; 2011–2013; 2013–2015; 2015–2017; 2017–2018	(Greece) G.N.O. Aris Nikaias (Greece) A.E. Nikaia (Greece) A.E.P. Olympias Patras (Greece) A.E. Nikaia (Greece) A.O. Pangratiou (Greece) Olympiacos S.F. Piraeus (Greece) E.A. Patras (Greece) Foinikas Syros V.C. (Greece) Kifissia V.C. (Greece) Olympiacos S.F. Piraeus (Greece) Kifissia V.C.

National team
2006–2016	Greece (33)

Dimitrios Soultanopoulos (Greek: Δημήτριος Σουλτανόπουλος, born 3 September 1981) is a Greek male retired volleyball player. He had 33 appearances with the Greece national team.

== Sporting achievements ==
=== National championships ===
- 2006/2007 Greek Championship with Olympiacos S.F. Piraeus
- 2007/2008 Greek Championship with Olympiacos S.F. Piraeus
- 2008/2009 Greek Championship with Olympiacos S.F. Piraeus
- 2009/2010 Greek Championship with Olympiacos S.F. Piraeus
- 2011/2012 Greek Championship with Foinikas Syros V.C.
- 2013/2014 Greek Championship with Kifissia V.C. Athens
- 2015/2016 Greek Championship with Olympiacos S.F. Piraeus

=== National cups ===
- 2008/2009 Greek Cup, with Olympiacos S.F. Piraeus
- 2009/2010 Greek Cup runners up, with Olympiacos S.F. Piraeus
- 2012/2013 Greek Cup runners up, with Foinikas Syros V.C.
- 2013/2014 Greek Cup runners up, with Kifissia V.C. Athens
- 2015/2016 Greek Cup, with Olympiacos S.F. Piraeus
- 2015/2016 Greek Cup, with Olympiacos S.F. Piraeus
- 2015/2016 Greek League Cup, with Olympiacos S.F. Piraeus
- 2016/2017 Greek League Cup, with Olympiacos S.F. Piraeus

=== Individual ===
- 2005 Greek Championship Best blocker
- 2012 Greek Championship Best middle blocker
- 2014 Greek Championship Best blocker
- 2014 Greek Championship Best middle blocker
- 2016 Greek Cup Most Valuable Player
- 2016 Greek League Cup Most Valuable Player
