= Konstantinos Christofidelis =

Greek volleyball player (born 1977)

Kostas Christofidelis

Personal information
- Full name: Konstantinos Christofidelis
- Born: 26 June 1977 (age 49); Kavala, Greece
- Height: 1.95 m (6 ft 5 in)
- Weight: 87 kg (192 lb)
- Spike: 341 cm (134 in)
- Block: 320 cm (130 in)

Coaching information
Previous teams coached
Years	Teams
2019–2022; 2022–2025; 2024–	Anorthosis Famagusta; Kifissia; Greece

Career
Years	Teams
1995–2009; 2009–2011; 2011–2012; 2012–2015; 2015–2017; 2017–2019	(Greece) Olympiacos Piraeus (Greece) Panathinaikos (Greece) Iraklis (Greece) Olympiacos Piraeus (Greece) Kifissia (Greece) Olympiacos Piraeus

National team
1997–2013	Greece (144)

Konstantinos "Kostas" Christofidelis (Greek: Κώστας Χριστοφιδέλης; born 26 June 1977) is a Greek former volleyball player. He played for the Greece men's national volleyball team. He was part of the national team at the 2004 Summer Olympics in Athens, Greece.

== Honours ==
- Hellenic Championship (11)
  - 1998, 1999, 2000, 2001, 2003, 2009, 2012, 2013, 2014, 2018, 2019
- Greek Cup (9)
  - 1997, 1998, 1999, 2001, 2009, 2010, 2012, 2013, 2014
- Hellenic League Cup (4)
  - 2013, 2015, 2018, 2019
- Hellenic Super Cup (1)
  - 2000
- CEV Cup (2)
  - 1996, 2005

=== Individually ===
- CEV Cup Best blocker: 2005
- CEV Cup Best receiver: 2005
- Hellenic Cup Most valuable player: 2009
- Hellenic Championship Best receiver: 2010
- Hellenic Championship Best outside spiker: 2012
- Hellenic Championship MVP: 2014

== See also ==
- Greece at the 2004 Summer Olympics
