= Marios Giourdas =

Greek volleyball player (born 1973)

Personal information
- Nationality: Greek
- Born: 2 March 1973 (age 53); Alexandroupoli, Greece
- Height: 2.02 m (6 ft 8 in)
- Weight: 90 kg (198 lb)
- Spike: 356 cm (140 in)
- Block: 341 cm (134 in)

Career
Years	Teams
1989–1991	(Greece) GE Alexandroupolis
1991–1994	(Greece) Ethnikos Alexandroupolis
1994–2003	(Greece) Olympiacos
2003–2004	(Italy) Unimade Parma
2004–2006	(Greece) Iraklis Thessaloniki
2006–2007	(Greece) Olympiacos
2007–2009	(Greece) EA Patras
2009–2010	(Greece) Ethnikos Alexandroupolis
2010–2013	(Greece) AONS Milon

National team
1991–2007	Greece (336)

Marios Giourdas (officially romanized as Gkiourdas) (Greek: Μάριος Γκιούρδας; born 2 March 1973) is a Greek former volleyball player. He was part of the Greece men's national volleyball team. He competed with the national team at the 2004 Summer Olympics in Athens, Greece. At club level, he played most notably for Olympiacos, Parma and Iraklis. Giourdas is also a firefighter in Athens. In 2016, during a fire near Pireaus, he, along with other firefighters, saved nine people and a baby.

== Clubs ==
- (Greece) Ethnikos Alexandroupolis (1987-1989)
- (Greece) GE Alexandroupolis (1989-1991)
- (Greece) Ethnikos Alexandroupolis (1991-1995)
- (Greece) Olympiacos Piraeus (1995-2003)
- (Italy) Unimade Parma (2003-2004)
- (Greece) Iraklis Thessaloniki (2004-2006)
- (Greece) Olympiacos Piraeus (2006-2007)
- (Greece) EA Patras (2007-2009)
- (Greece) Ethnikos Alexandroupolis (2009-2010)
- (Greece) AONS Milon (2010-2013)

== See also ==
- Greece at the 2004 Summer Olympics
