= Sinan Cem Tanık =

Turkish volleyball player and coach

Personal information
- Nationality: Turkish
- Born: 19 June 1980 (age 46); Ankara, Turkey
- Height: 1.98 m (6 ft 6 in)

Coaching information
- Current team: Santa Margarita Catholic High School Varsity boys' volleyball, head of Laguna Beach high school girls' volleyball, 949 Volleyball club coach (multiple teams)
Previous teams coached
Years	Teams
2017; 2018	Effector Kielce; AZS Częstochowa

Volleyball information
- Position: Outside hitter

Career
Years	Teams
1996–2000; 2000–2003; 2003–2004; 2004–2006; 2006–2008; 2008–2010; 2010–2011; 2011–2012; 2012; 2013; 2013–2014	Çankaya Belediyesi Anka; Erdemirspor Ereğli; Polis Akademisi; Halkbank Ankara; AZS Olsztyn; Halkbank Ankara; Galatasaray İstanbul; Iraklis Thessaloniki; Al Ain; CV Almería; Galatasaray İstanbul

National team
Turkey
Honours
Men's volleyball
Representing Turkey
European League
Bronze medal – third place	2008 Turkey
Bronze medal – third place	2010 Spain

Sinan Cem Tanık (born 19 June 1980) is a Turkish professional volleyball coach and former player. He studied at the Middle East Technical University in Ankara.

== Career ==
He played for the Polish team of Mlekpol AZS Olsztyn in the 2006–07 and 2007–08 season, and was the first Turkish player to have ever played in the Polish Volleyball League. He represented Turkey in over 100 games, and was a captain of the national team at the 2011 European Championship. He currently serves as the varsity boys' head coach at SMHS as well as the head of the laguna beach high school girls' volleyball program. He also served as a coach at Condcordia university.

Currently he is coaching boys’ and girls’ teams at the 949 volleyball club in San Juan Capistrano.

== Honours ==
=== Club ===
- National championships
  - 2001–02 Turkish Championship, with Erdemirspor Ereğli
  - 2011–12 Greek Cup, with Iraklis Thessaloniki
  - 2011–12 Greek Championship, with Iraklis Thessaloniki
  - 2011–12 UAE Championship, with Al Ain
  - 2012–13 Spanish Championship, with Unicaja Costa de Almería

=== Universiade ===
- 2005 Summer Universiade
