= Thanassis Moustakidis =

Greek volleyball player and coach (born 1962)

Personal information
- Nationality: Greek
- Born: 20 January 1962 (age 64); Soufli, Evros, Greece
- Height: 190 cm (6 ft 3 in)

Career
Years	Teams
1976–1987; 1987–1996; 1996–1998; 1998–2002	(Greece) Aris Thessaloniki (Greece) Olympiacos Piraeus (Greece) AEK Athens (Greece) Ethnikos Alexandroupoli

National team
1979–1995	Greece (413)
Honours
Men's volleyball
Representing Greece
European Championship
Bronze medal – third place	1987 Ghent	Team competition

Thanassis "Sakis" Moustakidis (Greek: Θανάσης "Σάκης" Μουστακίδης, born 20 January 1962) is a former Greek male volleyball player and current volleyball coach. He was part of the Greece men's national volleyball team that won the bronze medal at the 1987 European Championship in Belgium. He played for Olympiacos for 9 years (1987–1996), winning numerous titles.

== Clubs ==
- (Greece) Evros Soufliou (-1976)
- (Greece) Aris (1976–1987)
- (Greece) Olympiacos (1987–1996)
- (Greece) AEK (1996–1998)
- (Greece) Ethnikos Alexandroupolis V.C. (1998–2002)
