= 2018–19 Volleyleague (Greece) =

Volley League 2018–19
- League: Greek Volley League
- Sport: Volleyball
- Duration: 13 October 2018 – 30 March 2019 (regular season)
- Teams: 10
- TV partner: ERT

Regular season
- Season MVP: (Netherlands) Jeroen Rauwerdink
- Top scorer: (Canada) Taylor Hunt 453 points

Finals
- Champions: Olympiacos 29th title

Volleyleague seasons
- ← 2017–18 2019–20 →

The Greek Volley League 2018–19 championship is the 51st National championship and the 9th under the Volleyleague name. The championship started on Saturday, 20 October 2018 and the regular season is scheduled to complete on Saturday, 30 March 2019.

== Teams ==
Ten teams participate in 2018–19 Volleyleage. Teams in positions 1−8 from 2017–18, the two winning teams from 2017-18 Volleyleagur Play outs and two teams promoted from 2017 to 2018 A2 Ethniki Specifically:

- Teams in positions 1-8 of 2017–18 Volleyleague regular season: Olympiacos Piraeus, PAOK, Foinikas Syros, Kifissia, Iraklis Thessaloniki, ~~Iraklis Chalkidas~~, ~~Ethnikos Piraeus~~, Pamvohaikos Vocha.
- Teams in positions 1–2 on 2017–18 Volleyleague play outs: Ethnikos Alexandroupolis and Panathinaikos.
- Teams promoted from 2017 to 2018 A2 Ethniki: AEK, AE Komotini
- Teams relegated from 2017–18 Volleyleague: Niki Aiginiou and Panachaiki.
- Ethnikos Piraeus withdrew from 2018 to 2019 Volleyleague Greece due to financial reasons.
- Iraklis Chalkidas withdrew from 2018 to 2019 Volleyleague Greece due to not granted licence.

2018–19 Volleyleague season club locations

== Regular season ==
Regular season takes place in round robin format with each team playing all other teams twice. Teams in positions 1-8 advance in Playoffs positions 1−8, while teams in positions 9-10 will play each other to avoid relegation

=== Results ===
Home \ Away	AEK	ETA	IRA	KIF	KOM	OSFP	VCH	PAO	PAOK	SYR
AEK		3–0	3–2		3–1	1–3	1–3	3–2	0–3	
Ethnikos Alexandroupolis			3–2	3–0		0–3	3–2	0–3		3–2
Iraklis	3–0	3–0		3–0		2–3		2–3		0–3
Kifissia	3–2		3–0		3–2		3–0		0–3	2–3
AE Komotini	3–1	0–3	0–3	1–3			0–3	1–3	2–3	
Olympiacos Piraeus	3–0		3–0	3–0	3–1			3–1		3–2
Pamvohaikos			3–0	3–1		1–3		0–3	3–1	3–0
Panathinaikos				3–0	3–0	2–3			0–3	3–2
PAOK		3–0	3–0		3–0	0–3	3–2	3–0		
Foinikas Syros	2–3	3–0		2–3	3–1		3–0		3–2	

Legend: Blue = home team win; Yellow = draw; Red = away team win.

=== Standings ===
P	Team	Pt.	G	W	L	Set	Sr.	Points	Pr.	3–0	3–1	3–2	2–3	1–3	0–3	Result
1	Olympiacos Piraeus	46	18	16	2	51–18	2,83	1632–1421	1,148	7	6	3	1	1	0	Playoffs positions 1−8
2	PAOK	41	18	14	4	46–18	2,56	1501–1324	1,134	10	2	2	1	2	1	Playoffs positions 1−8
3	Panathinaikos	37	18	13	5	44–26	1,69	1608–1521	1,057	6	3	4	2	1	2	Playoffs positions 1−8
4	Foinikas Syros	30	18	9	9	40-35	1,14	1665–1624	1,025	4	2	3	6	1	2	Playoffs positions 1−8
5	Pamvohaikos	28	18	9	9	35–34	1,03	1539-1542	0,998	4	3	2	3	2	4	Playoffs positions 1−8
6	Kifissia	26	18	9	9	32-37	0,86	1539-1577	0,976	2	4	3	2	1	6	Playoffs positions 1−8
7	Iraklis	24	18	7	11	31–36	0,86	1468-1496	0,981	5	1	1	4	2	5	Playoffs positions 1−8
8	AEK	17	18	6	12	26–43	0,60	1480-1560	0,949	2	1	3	2	4	6	Playoffs positions 1−8
9	Ethnikos Alexandroupolis	16	18	6	12	22-42	0,52	1354-1456	0,930	3	0	3	1	2	9	Play outs
10	AE Komotini	5	18	1	17	14-52	0,27	1324-1589	0,833	0	1	0	2	7	8	Play outs

== Playoffs positions 1-8 ==
The teams that finish in the top eight after the regular season advance to the play-offs.

Quarterfinals
1	Olympiacos Piraeus	3	3	X
8	AEK	0	0	X
4	Foinikas Syros	3	3	X
5	Pamvohaikos	0	1	X
2	Panathinaikos	3	2	1
7	Kifissia	0	3	3
3	Iraklis	0	3	0
6	PAOK	3	1	3

Semifinals
1	Olympiacos Piraeus	3	3	0	3	X
4	Foinikas Syros	0	1	3	1	X
2	PAOK	3	3	3	X	X
6	Kifissia	0	1	0	X	X

Finals
1	Olympiacos Piraeus	3	3	3	X	X
2	PAOK	0	1	0	X	X

== Awards ==
- Most valuable player
  (Netherlands) Jeroen Rauwerdink (Olympiacos)
- Best setter
  (Denmark) Axel Jacobsen (Panathinaikos)
- Best outside spikers
  (Netherlands) Jeroen Rauwerdink (Olympiacos)
  (Brazil) Evandro Dias de Souza (Foinikas Syros)
- Best middle blockers
  (Greece) Giorgos Petreas (Olympiacos)
  (Serbia) Aleksandar Okolić (PAOK)
- Best opposite spiker
  (Canada) Gavin Schmitt (Olympiacos)
- Best libero
  (Greece) Dimitris Zisis (Panathinaikos)
