= Nea Smyrni =

Nea Smyrni Νέα Σμύρνη
- Municipality
- The Nea Smyrni Estia Hall

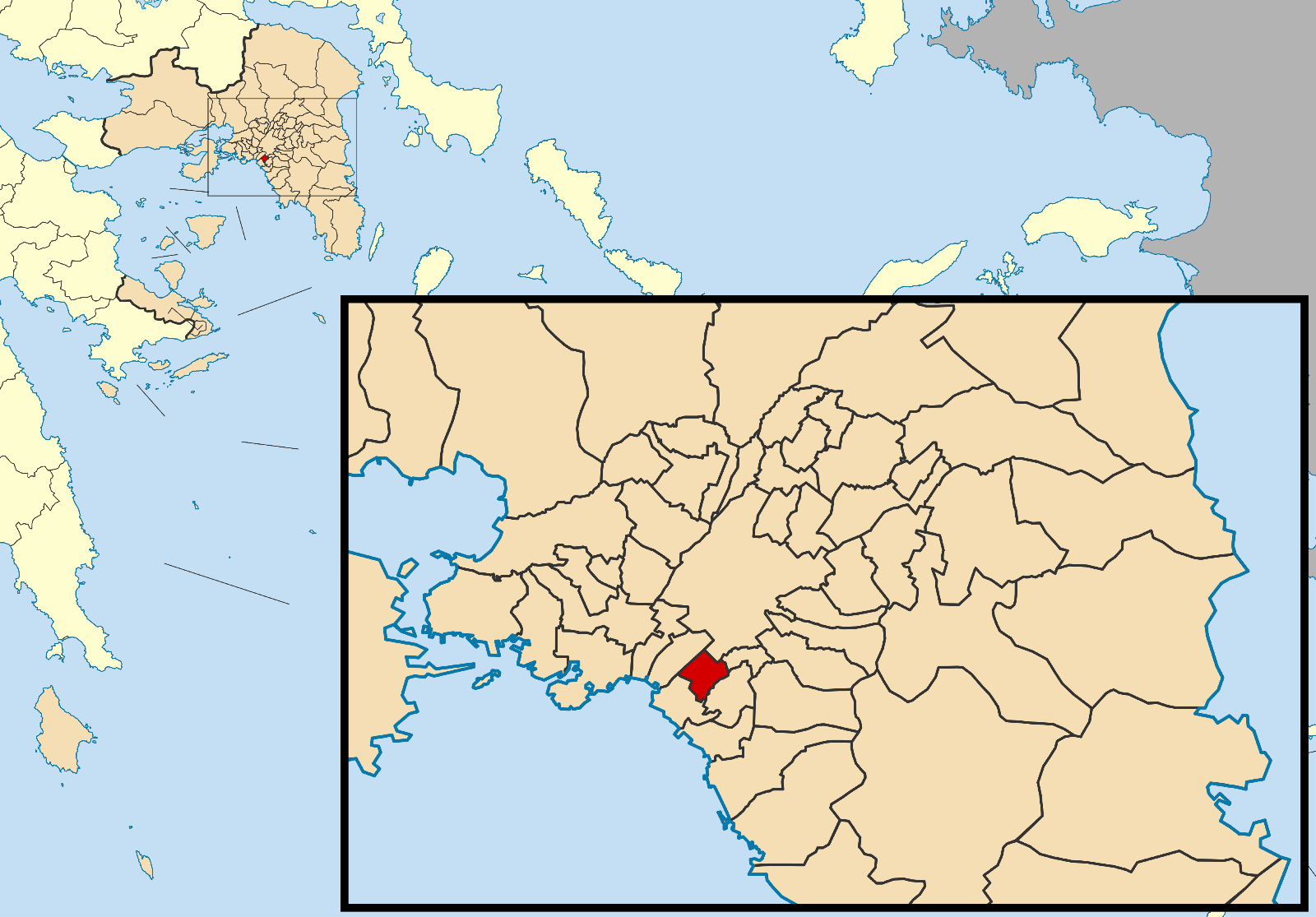

- Location within Greece
- Coordinates: 37°57′N 23°43′E
- Country: Greece
- Administrative region: Attica
- Regional unit: South Athens
- City established: 1926 (100 years ago)
- Municipality established: 1944 (82 years ago)

Government
  - Mayor: Georgios Koutelakis (since 2023)

Area
  - Municipality: 3.524 km^{2} (1.361 sq mi)
- Elevation: 50 m (160 ft)

Population (2021)
  - Municipality: 72,853
  - Density: 20,670/km^{2} (53,540/sq mi)
- Time zone: UTC+2 (EET)
  - Summer (DST): UTC+3 (EEST)
- Postal code: 171 xx
- Area code: 210
- Vehicle registration: Z
- Website: http://www.neasmyrni.gr/

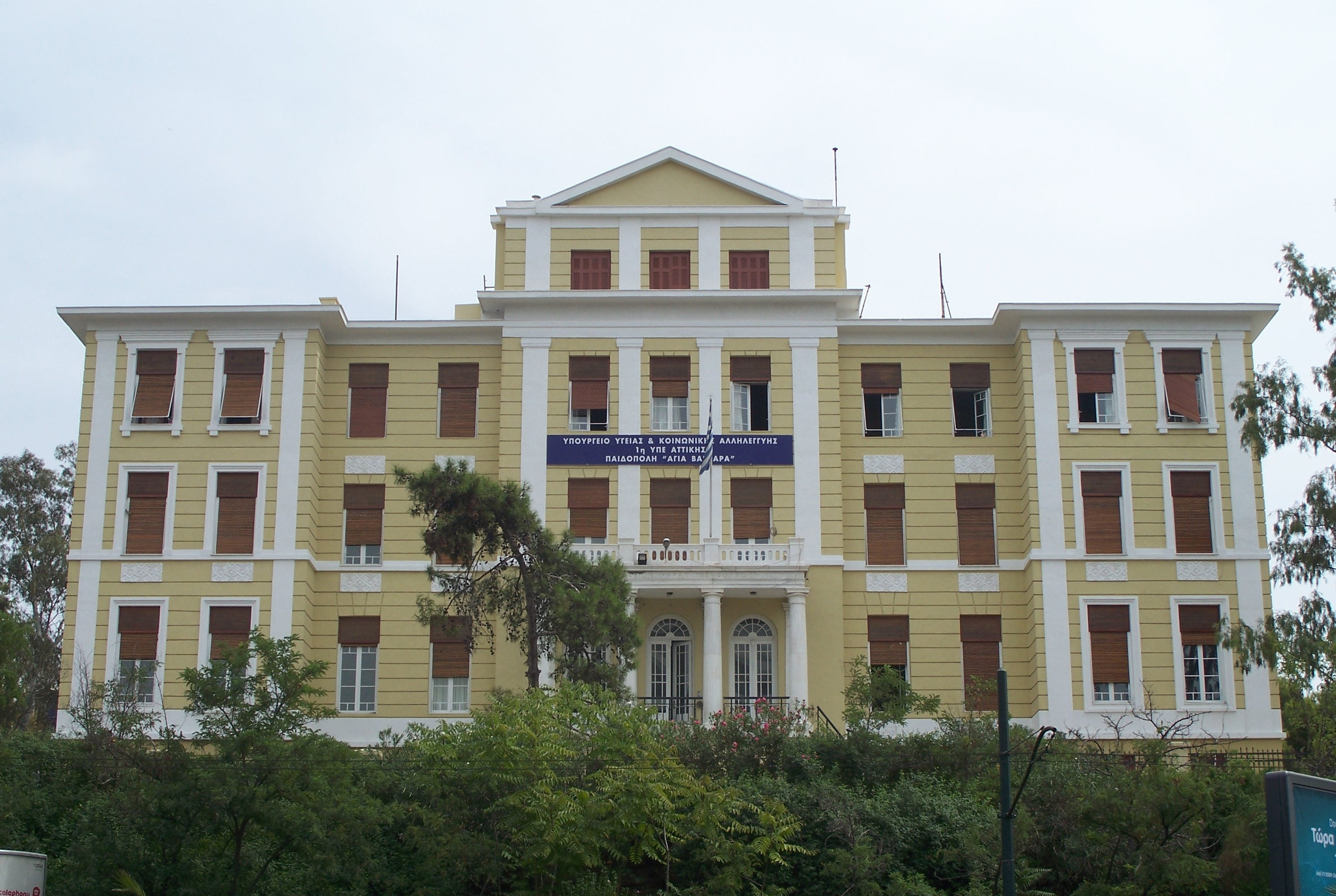
The Iosifogleion building, used as a child shelter since the 1930s, at Nea Smyrni

Nea Smyrni (Greek: Νέα Σμύρνη, Néa Smýrni, "New Smyrna") is a municipality and a town in South Athens, Greece. At the 2021 census, it had 72,853 inhabitants. It was named after the former Greek city Smyrna (today's İzmir in Turkey), whence many refugees arrived and settled in the Nea Smyrni area following the 1922 Burning of Smyrna, during the Greco-Turkish war.

== History ==
Although there are few details about the ancient history of the area, in 2012, during works, ancient graves were unearthed on the side of Agias Sofias Street. The specific manner of burial is known as 'burial by the roadside'. These ancient findings have already been unveiled by public authorities and are able to be visited.

Nea Smyrni began to be inhabited at the beginning of the 20th century. Up until that point, it had not been inhabited in a systematic manner. At the time, it was intersected by an avenue which connected Athens and Phalerum, the ancient port of the city.

After the Asia Minor Disaster, the government decided to construct a settlement in the area for the refugees from Smyrna. Construction of this settlement began in 1926. In 1928, the population was just 210. By 1933, the area had become a true town with a population of 6,500. By 1940, there were 15,000 inhabitants. In 1944, with the end of the war, Nea Smyrni became a municipality.

Nea Smyrni was the site of multiple clashes between British Army forces and ELAS resistance forces during the so-called Dekemvriana of 1944.

After the civil war, Nea Smyrni was incorporated into Athens.

== Geography ==
Nea Smyrni is located about 4 km (2 mi) southwest of central Athens. The municipality has an area of 3.524 km^{2}. Its built-up area is continuous with those of central Athens and the neighboring suburbs. It is the second-most densely populated municipality in Greece, following Kallithea, and one of the most densely populated cities in the world. The main thoroughfare is Andrea Syngrou Avenue, which forms the northwestern border of the municipality and connects it with central Athens and the coast.

=== Alsos Neas Smyrnis ===
Alsos Neas Smyrnis (Alsos meaning 'grove' or 'small wood') has an area of fifty acres and is bounded by Eleftheriou Venizelou, Ephesou, Kordeliou and Patriarchou Ioakeim III Avenues. The Alsos consists mainly (20%) of woodland trees (Aleppo pine, stone pine, cypress etc.) and ornamental trees (20%). In addition, most of this green space is covered in shrubs (cranberry, velvetleaf, myoporum and pyracantha). Today, conifers make up about 60% of the plant capacity. The plant material of the Alsos consists mainly of monoculture and introduced plants planted in very high density. Two fountains complete the architectural makeup of the area. The whole park is surrounded by iron railings.

=== Climate ===
Nea Smyrni, owing to its proximity to the Athens Riviera, has a hot semi-arid climate and an annual average temperature of 20.5 °C (68.9 °F). According to the National Observatory of Athens station (Class 2), Nea Smyrni has mild winters and hot summers, with particularly warm summer nights. The driest months are July and August while the rainiest period is during November and December. Nea Smyrni falls in 10b hardiness zone.

Climate data for Nea Smyrni (South Athens), (51 m a.s.l.) Climate: Hot semi-arid climate (BSh) • USDA: 10b (2.31°C)
Month	Jan	Feb	Mar	Apr	May	Jun	Jul	Aug	Sep	Oct	Nov	Dec	Year
Record high °C (°F)	22.7 (72.9)	24.1 (75.4)	25.7 (78.3)	31.3 (88.3)	37.4 (99.3)	40.8 (105.4)	42.2 (108.0)	42.9 (109.2)	37.1 (98.8)	32.4 (90.3)	27.9 (82.2)	22.9 (73.2)	42.9 (109.2)
Mean daily maximum °C (°F)	15.0 (59.0)	16.1 (61.0)	18.1 (64.6)	21.9 (71.4)	26.3 (79.3)	31.3 (88.3)	34.1 (93.4)	33.9 (93.0)	29.7 (85.5)	24.6 (76.3)	20.4 (68.7)	16.3 (61.3)	24.0 (75.1)
Daily mean °C (°F)	12.0 (53.6)	13.0 (55.4)	14.7 (58.5)	18.2 (64.8)	22.5 (72.5)	27.3 (81.1)	30.2 (86.4)	30.1 (86.2)	26.1 (79.0)	21.3 (70.3)	17.4 (63.3)	13.4 (56.1)	20.5 (68.9)
Mean daily minimum °C (°F)	9.1 (48.4)	10.0 (50.0)	11.4 (52.5)	14.5 (58.1)	18.6 (65.5)	23.3 (73.9)	26.4 (79.5)	26.3 (79.3)	22.4 (72.3)	17.9 (64.2)	14.4 (57.9)	10.6 (51.1)	17.1 (62.7)
Record low °C (°F)	−0.4 (31.3)	0.2 (32.4)	2.0 (35.6)	5.8 (42.4)	8.6 (47.5)	16.0 (60.8)	18.6 (65.5)	19.8 (67.6)	15.8 (60.4)	12.4 (54.3)	7.2 (45.0)	1.4 (34.5)	−0.4 (31.3)
Average rainfall mm (inches)	57.9 (2.28)	43.0 (1.69)	26.4 (1.04)	19.2 (0.76)	14.5 (0.57)	21.4 (0.84)	6.9 (0.27)	5.9 (0.23)	23.0 (0.91)	33.4 (1.31)	63.8 (2.51)	72.9 (2.87)	388.3 (15.28)
Source 1: National Observatory of Athens Monthly Bulletins (Feb 2012 - Aug 2026)
Source 2: Nea Smyrni N.O.A station and World Meteorological Organization

== Sporting teams ==
The sport clubs based in Nea Smyrni are Panionios G.S.S., multisport club founded in Smyrna, in 1890 and AONS Milon, multisport club founded in 1928.

Sport clubs based in Nea Smyrni
Club	Founded	Sports	Achievements
Panionios	1890	Football, Basketball, Water Polo, Track and Field and other sports	Panhellenic titles in football, basketball, basketball women and other honours.
AONS Milon	1928	Basketball, Volleyball and other sports	Panhellenic titles in volleyball, earlier presence in A1 Ethniki basketball

== Sites of interest ==
- Nea Smyrni Stadium, built in 1939, renovated in 1988. Panionios F.C. plays in the stadium.
- Nea Smyrni Indoor Hall, holds up to 1,832 persons.
- Nea Smyrni Square (Greek: Πλατεία Νέας Σμύρνης Platía Néas Smýrnis).
- Nea Smyrni Park, a 5-hectare centrally located park with about 40% trees.
- Estia Nea Smyrni, a cultural association.

== Neighbourhoods ==
- Faros
- Agia Fotini
- Alsos
- Kendro (Center)
- Chrisaki
- Agia Paraskevi
- Mitilineika
- Loutra
- Ano Nea Smyrni (Upper Nea Smyrni)

== Churches ==
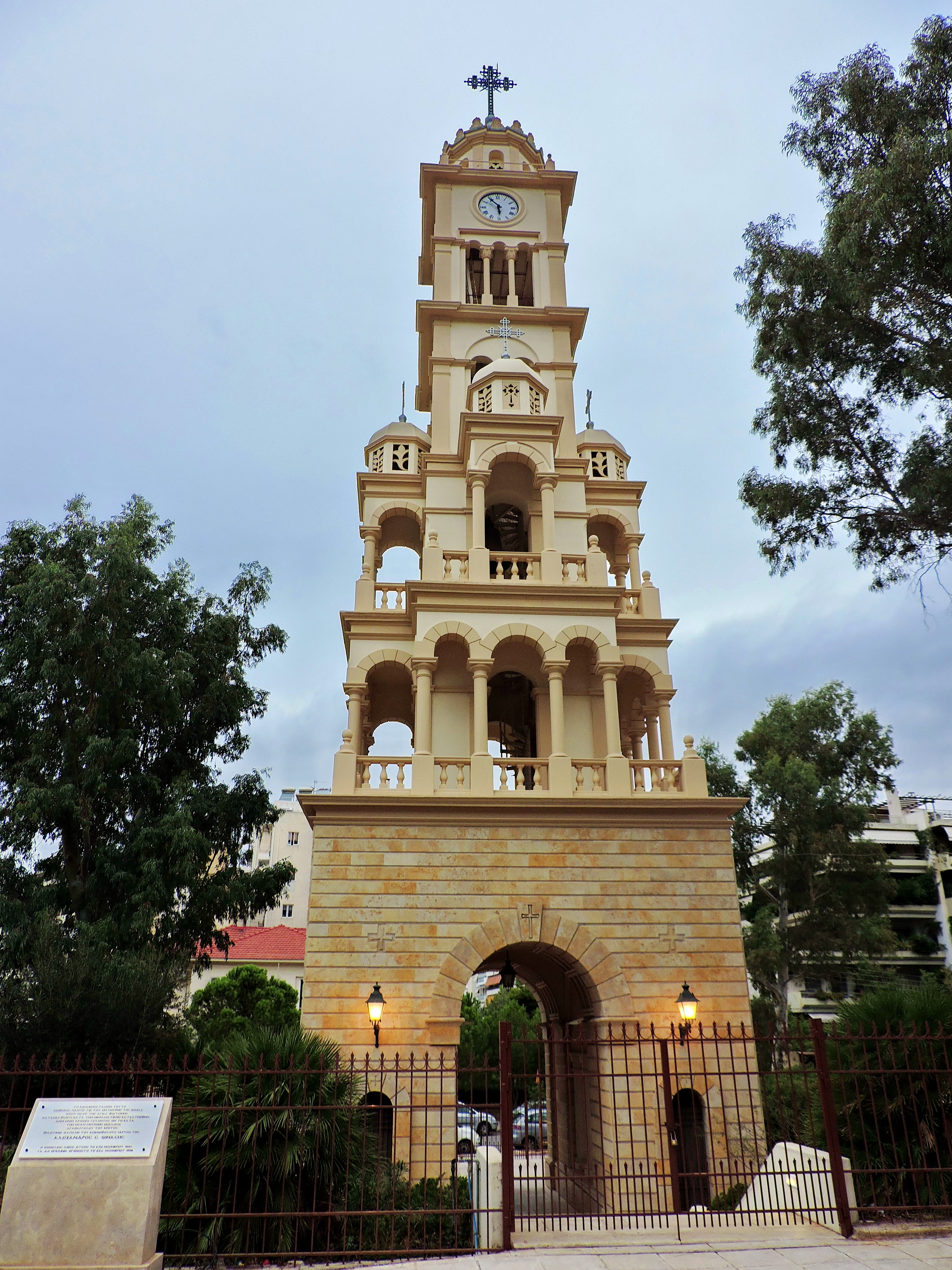
Belfry of Agia Foteini church, Nea Smyrni

- Agia Fotini
- Agia Paraskevi
- Agioi Anargiroi
- Agios Charalambos
- Agios Andreas
- Agioi Theodoroi (Greek Old Calendarists)
- Taxiarches (cemetery church)

Nea Smyrni is the seat of a similarly-titled metropolitan diocese. The current Metropolitan bishop of Nea Smyrni is Simeon Koutsas.

== Twin towns – sister cities ==
Sisian, Armenia (since 2004)

== Historical population ==
Year	Population
1928	210
1933	6,500
1940	15,114
1951	22,074
1961	32,865
1971	42,512
1981	67,408
1991	69,749
2001	73,986
2011	73,076
2021	72,853

== See also ==
- List of municipalities of Attica
