= O.F.I. (sports club) =

Greek multi-sport club

- Full name: Omilos Filathlon Irakliou; Όμιλος Φιλάθλων Ηρακλείου
- Founded: 1925; 101 years ago
- Colours: Black, White
- Club titles: Balkans Titles: 1 Domestic Titles: 2

O.F.I. (full name Omilos Filathlon Irakliou/ Greek: Όμιλος Φιλάθλων Ηρακλείου) is a Greek multi-sport club based in Heraklion, Crete. It is commonly known as OFI Crete. It was founded in 1925 and it has teams in football, basketball, volleyball, water polo, athletics and other sports. The most successful team of the club is the football team which is the only department which has won a Panhellenic title, two Greek Football Cups. The team's colours are black and white.

== Departments ==
- OFI Crete F.C., football team that plays in Super League Greece (2025–26)
- OFI Crete B.C., basketball team that plays in Greek B Basket League (2025–26)
- OFI Crete V.C., volleyball team that plays in A1 Ethniki Volleyball (2025–26)
- OFI Water Polo, Water Polo team that plays in A2 Ethniki Water Polo (2025–26)
- OFI Crete W.F.C., football team that plays in Greek A Division (2025–26)

== History ==
OFI was founded in 1925 and originally it comprised football, athletics, wrestling and weightlifting departments. The football team became the most famous and the most popular of the club. OFI Football Club achieved to promote to Alpha Ethniki in period 1967-68 for first time. After few years it was relegated but returned in A Ethniki again and it remained in the highest level for about 30 years. The football team is the only team of the club with Panhellenic title, since it has won the Greek cup in 1987. In recent years it is in a bad condition because of financial problems.

The club's men's basketball team won the championship of the Greek 4th-tier level Greek C Basket League in 1998, and was promoted to the third-tier level Greek B Basket League. After that, it was relegated back down the Greek C Basket League, but it returned to the Greek B Basket League in 2008.

The next year, OFI was promoted to the 2nd-tier level Greek A2 Basket League, for first time. After a short fall back into the Greek B Basket League, the club returned to the Greek A2 Basket League, and remained there until 2015, when the club was withdrawn from the league due to financial problems.

OFI has also water polo team with presence in A2 Ethniki (2nd-tier) and athletics team with successful presence in Pancretan Games.

== Sport facilities ==
The football team plays in Theodoros Vardinogiannis Stadium, known also as Yedi Kule. The other departments play in Vardinogiannis Sports Center (V.A.K.).

== Honours ==
Football team

- Greek Football Cup
  - Winners (2): 1986–87, 2025–26
- Greek Super Cup
  - Winners (1): 2026
- Balkans Cup
  - Winners (1): 1988–89

Basketball team

- Greek 3rd Division Champion: (2011)
- 2× Greek 4th Division 2nd Group Champion: (1998, 2008)

== Notable supporters ==
- Vana Barba, actor
- Eugène Gerards, Dutch footballer and coach, longest-serving OFI coach
- Giannis Kourakis, former mayor of Herakleion
- Manolis Lidakis, singer
- Nikos Machlas, football player, former OFI captain
- Nikos Nioplias, footballer and coach, former OFI captain
- Nikos Xylouris, singer
- Manolis Rasoulis, musician
- Georgios Samaras, football player
