= G.S. Lamias Achilleus =

Greek volleyball club

G.S. Lamia
- Full name: Gymnastikos Syllogos Lamia
- Founded: 1976
- Ground: Chalkiopoulio Sports Hall, Lamia (Capacity: 5,000)
- League: A1
- 2014-15: 10th

Uniforms
Home	Away

G.S. Lamia (Greek: Γ.Σ. Λαμία) is a Greek volleyball club based in Lamia. It was founded in 1976 and it plays in A1 Ethniki championship. The gymnasium of the club is the Lamia indoor hall and their colours are the cyan and white. Its emblem is owed to legendary hero of Phthiotis, Achilleus (Achilles).

== History ==
GS Lamia was founded in 1976. It was promoted to A1 Ethniki in 2005 and since then plays continuously in the highest level championship. The greatest success of Lamia was its presence in the final of Greek Cup twice, in 2007 and in 2012. The last season, Lamia was threatened with relegation but it was rescued in the play-out games.

=== Recent seasons ===
Season	Division	Place	Notes
2003-04	A2 Ethniki	5th	
2004-05	A2 Ethniki	1st	Promoted to A1 Ethniki
2005-06	A1 Ethniki	7th	
2006-07	A1 Ethniki	5th	Finalist Greek Cup
2007-08	A1 Ethniki	4th	
2008-09	A1 Ethniki	7th	
2009-10	A1 Ethniki	4th	
2010-11	A1 Ethniki	6th	
2011-12	A1 Ethniki	6th	Finalist Greek Cup
2012-13	A1 Ethniki	8th	
2013-14	A1 Ethniki	8th	
2014-15	A1 Ethniki	10th	
2015-16	A1 Ethniki	12th	Relegated to A2

== Honours ==
- Greek Volleyball Cup
  - Finalist (2): 2007, 2012
