= Greek Volleyball Cup =

Athletic contest

- Sport: Volleyball
- Founded: 1980
- Founder: Hellenic Volleyball Federation
- Country: Greece
- Most recent champion: Panathinaikos
- Most titles: Olympiacos (18)
- Domestic cup: Greek Championship
- Website: www.volleyball.gr

The Greek Volleyball Cup is organized by Hellenic Volleyball Federation and started in 1980–81 season. The competition was not held sometimes in the past for financial reasons . Olympiacos won the first Cup in 1981 and is the most successful club, having won the title 18 times. They are also the current Cup holders.

In 1986–87 edition, teams from the 1st Division did not take part. In 1998, Final 4 was established. In the period 2003–07, Final 8 were held. From 2003 to 2012 only the 1st Division teams competed for the trophy. From 2013 the participating clubs come from all divisions.

== Finals ==
Season	Winner	Score	Finalist	Sets	Venue	Location
1980–81	Olympiacos	3–0	Ethnikos Alexandroupoli	16–14, 15–10, 15–11	Panellinios Indoor Hall	Athens
1981–82	Panathinaikos	3–0	Esperos Byzantium	15–4, 15–2, 17–15	Pavlos and Thanasis Giannakopoulos Indoor Hall	Athens
1982–83	Olympiacos	3–1	PAOK	16–14, 15–11, 4–15, 15–8	Alexandreio Melathron	Thessaloniki
1983–84	Panathinaikos	3–1	Olympiacos	15–11, 9–15, 15–9, 15–13	Panellinios Indoor Hall	Athens
1984–85	Panathinaikos	3–0	Olympiacos	15–13, 16–14, 15–7	Peace and Friendship Stadium	Piraeus
1985–86	Not held					
1986–87*	Dimokritos	3–0	HANTH	15–06, 15–13, 15–12	Mikra Indoor Arena	Kalamaria, Thessaloniki
1987–88	Not held					
1988–89	Olympiacos	3–0	Aris	15–6, 15–13, 15–12	Nea Smyrni Indoor Hall	Nea Smyrni, Athens
1989–90	Olympiacos	3–0	Panathinaikos	15–11, 15–12, 17–15	Nea Smyrni Indoor Hall	Nea Smyrni, Athens
1990–91	Not held					
1991–92	Olympiacos	3–0	Aris	15–4, 15–10, 15–5	Alexandreio Melathron	Thessaloniki
1992–93	Olympiacos	3–0	Orestiada	15–7, 15–12, 15–5	Alexandreio Melathron	Thessaloniki
1993–94*	Olympiacos	3–0	Aris	15–10, 15–11, 15–8	Loutraki Indoor Hall	Loutraki
1994–96	Not held					
1996–97	Olympiacos	3–1	Aris	6–15, 15–3, 15–8, 15–7	Chalkiopoulio Sports Hall	Lamia
1997–98	Olympiacos	3–0	Aris	15–13, 18–16, 15–4	George Vasilakopoulos Indoor Hall	Pyrgos
1998–99	Olympiacos	3–1	AEK	25–16, 21–25, 25–17, 26–24	Dimitris Krachtidis Indoor Hall	Drama
1999–2000	Iraklis	3–0	Olympiacos	25–20, 25–21, 25–21	E.A. Patras Indoor Hall	Patras
2000–01	Olympiacos	3–0	Iraklis	27–25, 25–21, 25–16	Philippos Amiridis Arena	Xanthi
2001–02	Iraklis	3–1	Aris	25–20, 25–27, 25–19, 25–19	Alexandreio Melathron	Thessaloniki
2002–03	A.E. Nikaia	3–2	Panathinaikos	25–22, 25–27, 25–21, 22–25, 18–16	Tenta Indoor Hall	Kalamata
2003–04	Iraklis	3–1	Olympiacos	22–25, 25–23, 25–17, 25–19	Nikos Samaras Indoor Hall	Orestiada
2004–05	Iraklis	3–0	Olympiacos	27–25, 25–20, 25–21	Melina Merkouri Indoor Hall	Rethymno
2005–06	Iraklis	3–0	Panathinaikos	25–19, 25–17, 25–22	Amaliada Ilida Indoor Hall	Amaliada
2006–07	Panathinaikos	3–0	Achilleas Lamia	25–17, 25–21, 26–24	Dimitris Tofalos Arena	Patras
2007–08	Panathinaikos	3–1	E.A. Patras	21–25, 25–16, 25–18, 25–17	Nikos Samaras Indoor Hall	Orestiada
2008–09	Olympiacos	3–2	Panathinaikos	25–23, 22–25, 23–25, 25–20, 17–15	Faliro Sports Pavilion Arena	Palaio Faliro, Athens
2009–10	Panathinaikos	3–2	Olympiacos	20–25, 25–22, 22–25, 25–23, 18–16	Faliro Sports Pavilion Arena	Palaio Faliro, Athens
2010–11	Olympiacos	3−1	Iraklis	21–25, 25–20, 25–21, 25–12	Nikos Samaras Indoor Hall	Orestiada
2011–12	Iraklis	3−0	Achilleas Lamia	25–21, 25–20, 25–19	Dimitris Vikelas Arena	Ermoupoli
2012–13	Olympiacos	3−0	Foinikas Syros	28–26, 25–21, 25–22	Melina Merkouri Indoor Hall	Rethymno
2013–14	Olympiacos	3−1	Kifissia	19–25, 25–18, 25–20, 25–23	Kalamata Coast Indoor Hall	Kalamata
2014–15	PAOK	3−1	Olympiacos	25–21, 26–28, 25–22, 25–22	Dimitris Vikelas Arena	Ermoupoli
2015–16	Olympiacos	3−0	Kifissia	25–19, 25–23, 25–22	Makis Liougas Indoor Hall	Glyfada, Athens
2016–17	Olympiacos	3−1	Kifissia	25–13, 19–25, 25–22, 29–27	Alexandreio Melathron	Thessaloniki
2017–18	PAOK	3−0	Iraklis	25–18, 25–16, 25–18	Kallithea Palais des Sports	Rhodes
2018–19	PAOK	3−1	Iraklis	20–25, 25–12, 25–20, 27–25	Markos Foniadakis Indoor Hall	Ierapetra
2019–20	Cancelled due to the COVID-19 pandemic					
2020–21	Not held due to the COVID-19 pandemic					
2021–22	PAOK	3−0	Foinikas Syros	25–18, 33–31, 25–19	Makis Liougas Indoor Hall	Glyfada, Athens
2022–23	PAOK	3–1	Olympiacos	18–25, 25–20, 25–21, 25–21	Tenta Indoor Hall	Kalamata
2023–24	Olympiacos	3–2	AONS Milon	19–25, 25–19, 25–22, 22–25, 16–14	Larissa Neapolis Indoor Arena	Larissa
2024–25	Olympiacos	3–1	PAOK	25–21, 25–17, 20–25, 25–21	Kostakioi T9 Indoor Hall	Arta
2025–26	Panathinaikos	3–2	Flisvos Palaio Faliro	20–25, 25–20, 20–25, 25–16, 15–9	Larissa Neapolis Indoor Arena	Larissa

Notes:
• In 1987, teams from the 1st Division did not take part. In the final, Demokritos Thessaloniki defeated HANTH 3–0 sets.
• In 1994, the Greek Cup was cancelled and a final 4 tournament was held in memory of Melina Merkouri. International players were absent due to the 1994 World Championship. In the final, Olympiacos Piraeus defeated Aris Thessaloniki 3–0 sets.
• The 1986, 1988, 1991, 1995, 1996 editions were not held for financial reasons.
• In 1998, final 4 was established. In the period 2003−07, final 8 were held.

== Titles by club ==
Club	Cups	Season
Olympiacos	18	1981, 1983, 1989, 1990, 1992, 1993, 1997, 1998, 1999, 2001, 2009, 2011, 2013, 2014, 2016, 2017, 2024, 2025
Panathinaikos	7	1982, 1984, 1985, 2007, 2008, 2010, 2026
Iraklis	6	2000, 2002, 2004, 2005, 2006, 2012
PAOK	5	2015, 2018, 2019, 2022, 2023
A.E. Nikaia	1	2003
Demokritos	1	1987

== Most valuable player by edition ==
- 1997–98 – (Greece) Marios Giourdas
- 1998–99 – (Greece) Vasileios Kournetas
- 1999–00 – (Slovakia) Andrej Kravárik
- 2000–01 – (Greece) Marios Giourdas (x2)
- 2001–02 – (United States) Tom Hoff
- 2002–03 – (Argentina) Jorge Elgueta
- 2003–04 – (Bulgaria) Nikolay Jeliazkov
- 2004–05 – (Greece) Marios Giourdas (x3)
- 2005–06 – (United States) Clayton Stanley
- 2006–07 – (Brazil) Dante Amaral
- 2007–08 – (Colombia) Liberman Agámez
- 2008–09 – (Greece) Konstantinos Christofidelis
- 2009–10 – (Colombia) Liberman Agámez (x2)
- 2010–11 – (Cuba) Rolando Despaigne
- 2011–12 – (Cuba) Rolando Despaigne (x2)
- 2012–13 – (Bulgaria) Boyan Yordanov
- 2013–14 – (Bulgaria) Boyan Yordanov (x2)
- 2014–15 – (Greece) Vasileios Kournetas (x2)
- 2015–16 – (Greece) Dimitrios Soultanopoulos
- 2016–17 – (Serbia) Konstantin Čupković
- 2017–18 – (Greece) Rafail Koumentakis
- 2018–19 – (United States) Garrett Muagututia
- 2021–22 – (Greece) Rafail Koumentakis (x2)
- 2022–23 – (Greece) Alexandros Raptis
- 2023–24 – (Greece) Mitar Tzourits
- 2024–25 – (Canada) John Gordon Perrin
- 2025–26 – (Greece) Athanasios Protopsaltis
