= Vrachati =

Vrachati Βραχάτι
- Community
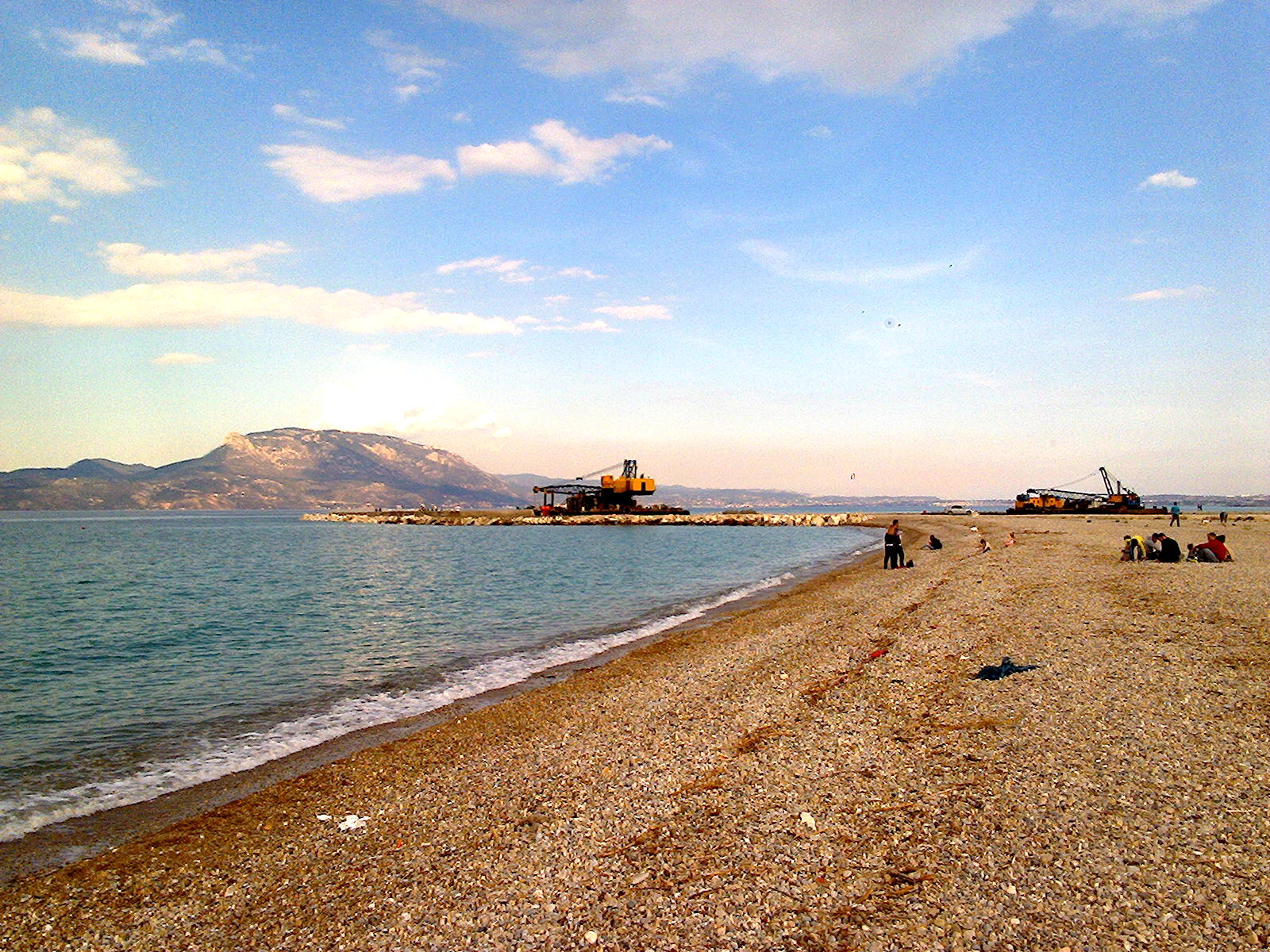
- A view of Vrahati's seashore.

- Location within Greece
- Coordinates: 37°57′N 22°48′E
- Country: Greece
- Administrative region: Peloponnese
- Regional unit: Corinthia
- Municipality: Velo-Vocha
- Municipal unit: Vocha

Population (2021)
  - Community: 3,603
- Time zone: UTC+2 (EET)
  - Summer (DST): UTC+3 (EEST)
- Vehicle registration: ΚΡ

Vrachati (Greek: Βραχάτι) is a beach town in the municipal unit of Vocha, Corinthia, Greece, population 3,603 (2021). It is located 12 km west of Corinth, and is a very popular destination for day trippers from Athens. Its beach has been awarded with the blue flag from the European Union. Vrachati is located on the Gulf of Corinth. The local economy is based on tourism and on the production of citrus fruits.
