= Pamvohaikos V.C. =

Greek volleyball club

Pamvohaikos
- Founded: 1961
- Ground: Vrahati
- League: A1
- 2017–18: 8th
- Website: Club home page

Uniforms
Home	Away

Pamvohaikos or Pamvochaikos (Greek: Παμβοχαϊκός) is a Greek volleyball club based in Vrachati, Vocha, Corinthia. It was founded in 1961. Since 2012, it plays in first division of Greek volleyleague (A1 Ethniki). Its home is at Vrahati, Corinthia and its colours are blue and yellow. The most successful accolade of Pamvohaikos was the second place of championship, in 2012–13 season.

== Recent seasons ==
Pamvohaikos was promoted to A1 Ethniki in season 2010–11, for first time. At the first years in A1 Ethniki finished in the top places of the championship. In current season finished in 5th place.

Season	Division	Place	Notes
2009-10	A2 Ethniki	8th	
2010-11	A2 Ethniki	2nd	Promoted to A1 Ethniki
2011-12	A1 Ethniki	3rd	
2012-13	A1 Ethniki	2nd	
2013-14	A1 Ethniki	5th	
2014-15	A1 Ethniki	7th	
2015-16	A1 Ethniki	6th	

== Honours ==
- Greek Volleyball Championship
  - Finalist (1): 2013
