= Greek Volleyball League Cup =

Sports competition in Greece

League Cup "Nikos Samaras"
- Sport: Volleyball
- Founded: 2011
- Founder: Hellenic Volleyball Federation
- Country: Greece
- Most recent champion: Olympiacos Piraeus (8)
- Most titles: Olympiacos Piraeus (8)
- Website: www.volleyball.gr

Greek Volleyball League Cup "Nikos Samaras" is the third domestic competition of Greek Volleyball, started in the 2011–12 season. The first League Cup was won by Foinikas Syros. Olympiacos Piraeus are the current League Cup holders. Since 2013, the competition is named Nikos Samaras after the great Greek volleyball player who died suddenly in January 2013, at the age of 43.

== Titles ==
| Season | Winner | Score | Finalist | Place | source |
|---|---|---|---|---|---|
| 2011–12 | Foinikas Syros | 3–0 | Apollon Kalamarias | Syros | |
| 2012–13 | Olympiacos Piraeus | 3–0 | Kifissia | Vrachati | |
| 2013–14 | AEK | 3–2 | Foinikas Syros | Alexandroupoli | |
| 2014–15 | Olympiacos Piraeus | 3–1 | Ethnikos Alexandroupoli | Glyfada | |
| 2015–16 | Olympiacos Piraeus | 3–2 | PAOK | Syros | |
| 2016–17 | Olympiacos Piraeus | 3–0 | PAOK | Rentis | |
| 2017–18 | Olympiacos Piraeus | 3–0 | Ethnikos Alexandroupoli | Syros | |
| 2018–19 | Olympiacos Piraeus | 3–1 | Foinikas Syros | Syros | |
| 2018–19 | Olympiacos Piraeus | 3–1 | Foinikas Syros | Rentis | |
| 2019–20 | Panathinaikos | 3–2 | Olympiacos Piraeus | Rentis | |
| 2019–20 | Panathinaikos | 2–3; 15–13 (GS) | Olympiacos Piraeus | Marousi | |
| 2020–21 | Foinikas Syros | 3–1 | Filippos Veria | Veria | |
| 2021–22 | Panathinaikos | 2–3 | PAOK | Pylaia | |
| 2021–22 | Panathinaikos | 3–0 | PAOK | Marousi | |
| 2022–23 | Panathinaikos | 3–2 | Olympiacos Piraeus | Rentis | |
| 2022–23 | Panathinaikos | 3–2 | Olympiacos Piraeus | Marousi | |
| 2023–24 | Panathinaikos | 3–0 | PAOK | Pylaia | |
| 2023–24 | Panathinaikos | 2–3 | PAOK | Mets | |
| 2024–25 | Olympiacos Piraeus | 3–0 | PAOK | Arta | |
| 2025–26 | Olympiacos Piraeus | 3–1 | PAOK | Athens | |

=== Performance by club ===
| Club | Cups | Season |
|---|---|---|
| Olympiacos | 8 | 2013, 2015, 2016, 2017, 2018, 2019, 2025, 2026 |
| Panathinaikos | 4 | 2020, 2022, 2023, 2024 |
| Foinikas Syros | 2 | 2012, 2021 |
| AEK | 1 | 2014 |

== Most valuable player by edition ==
- 2011–12 – (Greece) Stelios Nikiforidis (Οutside Hitter - Foinikas Syros)
- 2012–13 – (Bulgaria) Boyan Yordanov (Opposite - Olympiacos Piraeus)
- 2013–14 – (Greece) Nikos Kretsis (Setter - AEK Athens)
- 2014–15 – (Greece) Giorgos Stefanou (Libero - Olympiacos Piraeus)
- 2015–16 – (Greece) Dimitris Soultanopoulos (Middle blocker - Olympiacos Piraeus)
- 2016–17 – (Serbia) Konstantin Čupković (Οutside Hitter - Olympiacos Piraeus)
- 2017–18 – (Netherlands) Jeroen Rauwerdink (Οutside Hitter - Olympiacos Piraeus)
- 2018–19 – (Greece) Nikos Zoupanis (Opposite - Olympiacos Piraeus)
- 2019–20 – (Denmark) Axel Jacobsen (Setter - Panathinaikos AO)
- 2020–21 – (Slovenia) Žiga Štern (Οutside Hitter - Foinikas Syros)
- 2021–22 – (Greece) Thanasis Protopsaltis (Οutside Hitter - Panathinaikos AO)
- 2022–23 – (Italy) Jiří Kovář (Οutside Hitter - Panathinaikos AO)
- 2023–24 – (Cuba) Fernando Hernández (Opposite - Panathinaikos AO)
- 2024–25 – (Greece) Mitar Tzourits (Middle blocker - Olympiacos Piraeus)
- 2025–26 – (Serbia) Aleksandar Atanasijević (Opposite - Olympiacos Piraeus)
