= G.S. Iraklis Thessaloniki (men's volleyball) =

Men's volleyball team in Greece

G.S. Iraklis Thessalonikis
- Full name: Γυμναστικός Σύλλογος Θεσσαλονίκης «Ηρακλής»; Gymnastikos Syllogos Thessalonikis "Iraklis"; (Thessaloniki Gymnastic Club "Heracles")
- Nickname: Γηραιός (Elder); Ημίθεος (Demigod); Αυτοκράτορας (Emperor)
- Founded: 1921; 105 years ago
- Ground: Katsaneio Indoor Hall (Capacity: 350)
- Chairman: Ephraim Kyrizidis
- Manager: Stefanos Nanas
- League: Pre League
- 2025–26: Pre League, 3rd of 10
- Website: iraklis.club/volley-andron
- Championships: 5 Greek Championships; 6 Greek Cups; 4 Greek Super Cups

G.S. Iraklis Thessalonikis, also known as Iraklis NEW PALLET after its title sponsor, is a volleyball team based in Thessaloniki, Macedonia, Greece. Founded in 1921, it serves as the men's volleyball section of the multisports club of G.S. Iraklis Thessalonikis. The team's colors are blue and white. They play their home matches at Katsaneio Indoor Hall. As of 2022, the team competes in the second–tier Greek Pre League.

The team has evolved into one best teams in Greece, as they have won the Greek Championship 5 times (2002, 2005, 2007, 2008, 2012) and reached the final of the CEV Champions League 3 times (2005, 2006, 2009).

== History ==
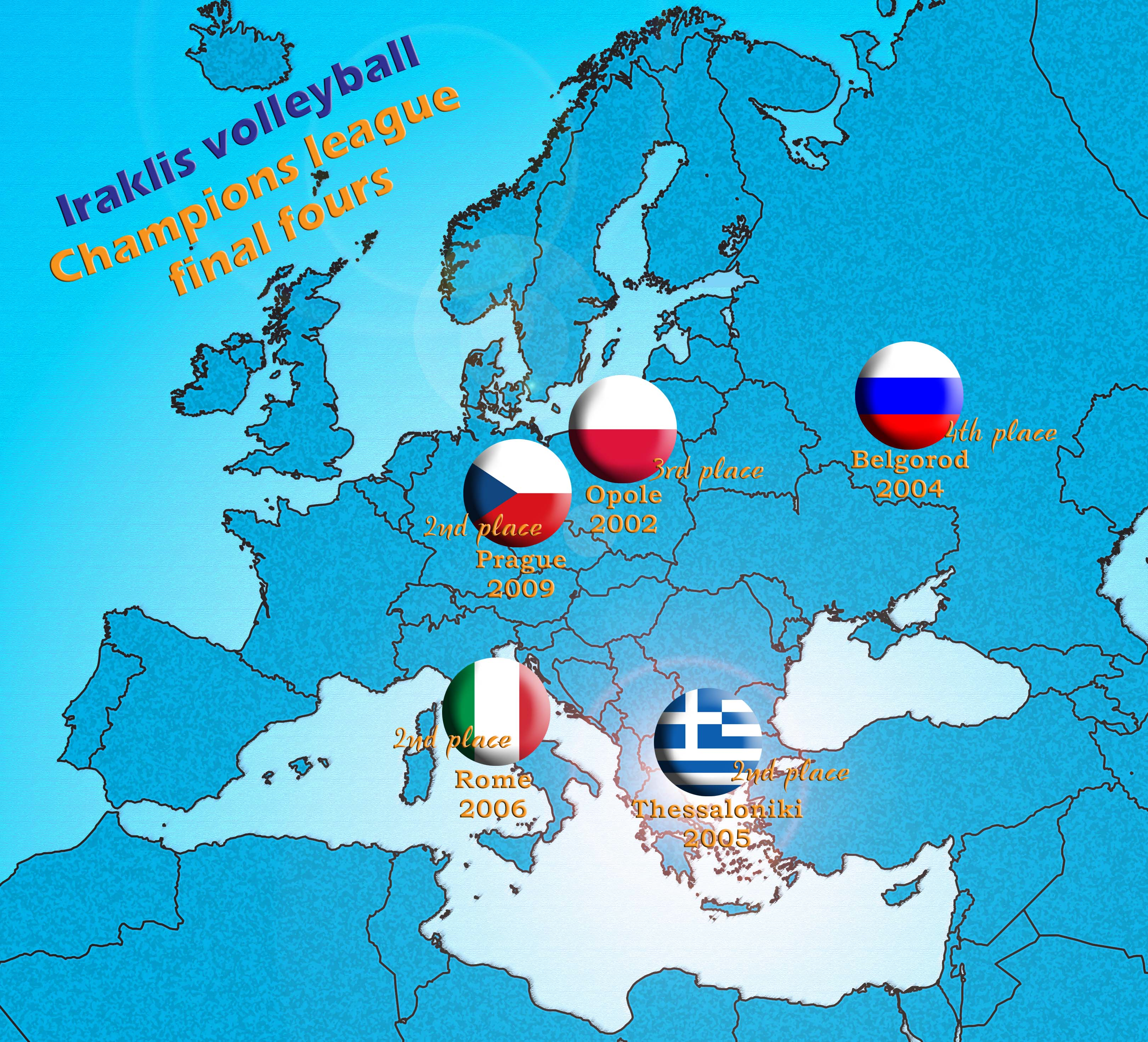
The 5 final-fours of G.S. Iraklis Thessaloniki in CEV Champions League.

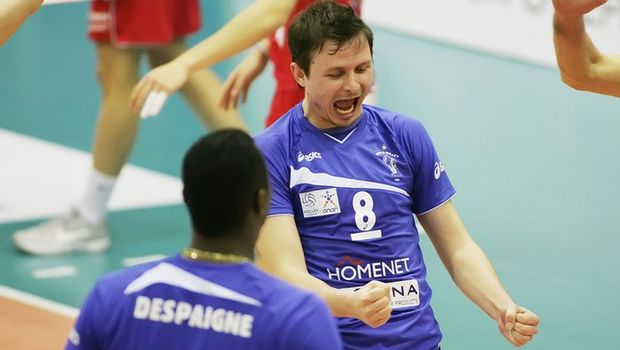
Konstantinos Prousalis

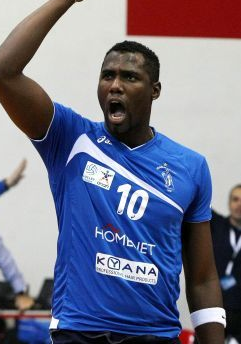
Rolando Jurquin

Iraklis was one of the first Greek clubs which encouraged volleyball before World War II. After the war, they were always among the top teams in Greece. The first national championship was played in 1968 and Iraklis was also able to contribute to the National Teams with plenty of players. During the 1970s, Iraklis participated twice in the championship finals, due to the contribution of Nikos Antoniadis. In 1987, 1989 and 1992 Iraklis made it to the European Cup and in 1997 came the outburst of the team.

Thanks to an organized effort, Iraklis played three consecutive Championship finals and finally won its first title -the Greek Cup- in 2000. Two years later, the team won both the Championship and the Cup titles, while finishing third in the CEV Champions League final-four held in Opole, Poland.

The next four years Iraklis dominated in Greece, confirming his superiority by winning one Championship (2005), three Greek Cups (2004, 2005, 2006) and two Greek Super Cups (2004, 2005), but mostly by participating in three more CEV Champions League final-fours. In 2004 in Belgorod, Russia, the team finished in the fourth place. Next year, the presence of world-class players such as Lloy Ball, Thomas Hoff and Clayton Stanley helped the team to reach the final-four which took place in Thessaloniki, Greece. Iraklis beat Lokomotiv Belgorod in the semi-final, but lost 1-3 to Tours VB in the final, despite the outstanding support by the fans. In 2006, Iraklis made it again to the final in Rome, Italy, to be beaten by Sisley Treviso 3-1. About 4,000 Iraklis fans traveled to Rome to support the team.

The following season marked the beginning of a transitional period. Many of the top players were released from the team, while the budget was cut in half. Even so, the team's dominance in Greece continued. In 2007, Iraklis finished third in regular season, but managed to win the Championship beating Olympiacos S.C. in the semi-finals and Panathinaikos VC in the finals, having both times a disadvantage. The next Championship (2007–08) had the same conclusion. Iraklis defeated Panathinaikos VC in the finals without losing a single game and won the championship for the fourth time in their history.

== Notable players ==
- (Greece) Andreas Andreadis
- (Greece) Theodoros Bozidis
- (Greece) Theodoros Chatziantoniou
- (Greece) Konstantinos Christofidelis
- (Greece) Christos Dimitrakopoulos
- (Greece) Marios Giourdas
- (Greece) Theoklitos Karipidis
- (Greece) Chrysanthos Kyriazis
- (Greece) Konstantinos Prousalis
- (Greece) Nikos Samaras
- (Greece) Nikolaos Smaragdis
- (Greece) Georgios Stefanou
- (Bulgaria) (Greece) Theodoros Baev
- (Slovakia) (Greece) Andrej Kravárik
- (Argentina) Rodrigo Quiroga
- (Belgium) Frank Depestele
- (Belarus) Aleh Akhrem
- (Bulgaria) Plamen Konstantinov
- (Cuba) Freddy Brooks
- (Cuba) Joël Despaigne
- (Cuba) Rolando Jurquin
- (France) Frantz Granvorka
- (Germany) Simon Tischer
- (Italy) Matej Černič
- (Serbia) Slobodan Boškan
- (Sweden) Marcus Nilsson
- (Turkey) Sinan Cem Tanık
- (United States) Lloy Ball (FIVB Hall of Fame)
- (United States) Brook Billings
- (United States) Thomas Hoff
- (United States) Clayton Stanley

== Notable coaches ==
- (Greece) Alekos Leonis
- (Italy) Flavio Gulinelli
- (Sweden) Anders Kristiansson (FIVB Hall of Fame)

== Honours ==
=== Domestic ===
Greek Championship

- Winners (5): 2002, 2005, 2007, 2008, 2012
- Runners-up (8): 1971, 1975, 1999, 2000, 2001, 2003, 2006, 2011

Greek Cup

- Winners (6): 2000, 2002, 2004, 2005, 2006, 2012
- Runners-up (4): 2001, 2011, 2018, 2019

Greek Super Cup

- Winners (4) (record): 2004, 2005, 2007, 2008
- Runners-up (2): 2000, 2006

Greek A2 League

- Winners (1): 2015

=== European ===
CEV Champions League

- Runners-up (3): 2005, 2006, 2009
- Third place (1): 2002
- Fourth place (1): 2004

== See also ==
- G.S. Iraklis Thessaloniki
- Iraklis F.C. (Thessaloniki)
- List of Iraklis Thessaloniki F.C. players
- List of Iraklis F.C. seasons
- G.S. Iraklis Thessaloniki (men's basketball)
- Iraklis B.C. in international competitions
- G.S. Iraklis Thessaloniki (women's basketball)
- Ivanofeio Sports Arena
- G.S. Iraklis Thessaloniki (women's volleyball)
- G.S. Iraklis Thessaloniki (water polo)
- G.S. Iraklis Thessaloniki (rugby)
