= AONS Milon =

Greek multisport club

- Full name: Athletic Club of Nea Smyrni Milon
- Founded: 1928
- Based in: Nea Smyrni, Greece
- Arena: Milon Gymnasium (Capacity: 1,300)
- Colours: Green, Black
- Titles: 2 Greek Volleyball Championships
- Website: www.aonsmilon.gr

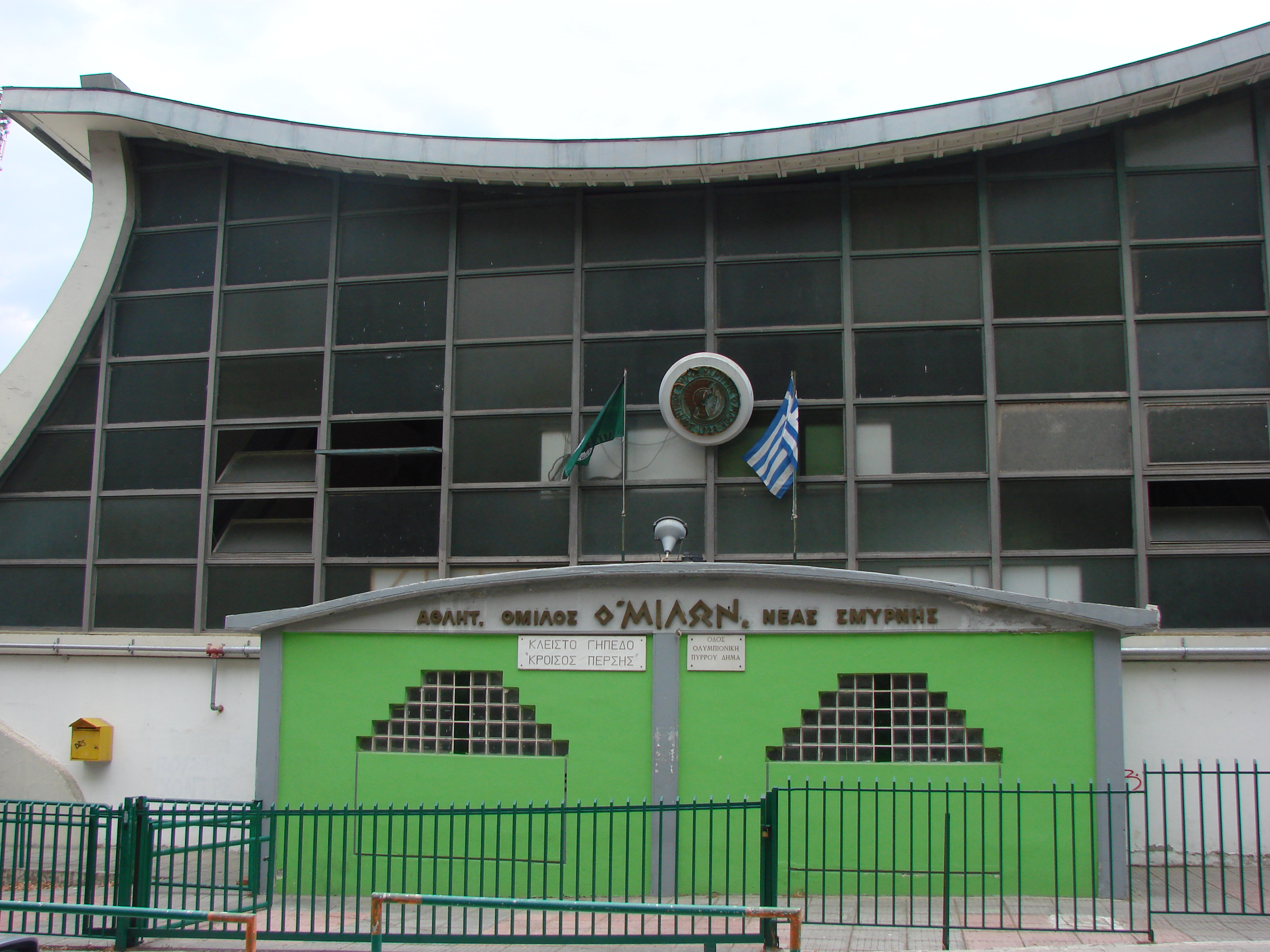
Milon Gymnasium

Athletic Club of Nea Smyrni Milon (Greek: Αθλητικός Όμιλος Νέας Σμύρνης Μίλων/ΑΟΝΣ Μίλων) or simply AONS Milon is a multisport club in Greece that based in Nea Smyrni. It was founded in 1928 by a group of refugees which came in Nea Smyrni. The club's colours are green and black. The home of the club is the Milon Gymnasium with a capacity of 1,300 seats.

== History ==
The club was founded in 1928 in Nea Smyrni by a group of refugees. The first name of the club was Athletic Club of Nea Smirni (in Greek ΑΟΝΣ/AONS). Some years later the Tennis Club of Nea Smyrna was incorporated in AONS. Until 1939 this club was the unique club of Nea Smyrni but that year moved there Panionios that was moved from Athens. During 1958 many athletes from Milon Alexandria, a Greek club in Egypt, was incorporated in AONS and the name of the club changed to AONS Milon. In 1968, the gymnasium of the club was built in Nea Smyrni. Milon has many departments in several sports. The basketball team has played in first division (A1 Ethniki) two times while several well known basketball players have played for Milon. It is noteworthy that NBAer top scorer Mitchell Wiggins has played for Milon in 1993 season. Milon Volleyball team has won 2 Greek Championships. Volleyball team has played 13 times in first division, last of them was the period 2020–2021.

== Departments ==
- Volleyball team
- Basketball team
- Swimming team
- Water polo team
- Tennis team
- Baseball team
- Weightlifting
- Wrestling

== Titles ==
- Greek Volleyball Championship
  - Winner (2): 1962, 1964
