= A1 Ethniki Volleyball =

Top-tier men's volleyball league in Greece

Greek Volleyball League
- Current season, competition or edition: 2023–24 Volleyleague (Greece)
- Sport: Volleyball
- Founded: 1928
- No. of teams: 10
- Country: Greece
- Continent: Europe
- Most recent champion: Panathinaikos (22)
- Most titles: Olympiacos (32)
- Broadcaster: ERT
- Relegation to: Pre League (2nd Tier)
- Domestic cups: Greek Cup; League Cup
- International cups: CEV Champions League; CEV Cup; CEV Challenge Cup
- Website: volleyleague.gr

The A1 Ethniki (Greek: Α1 Εθνική Κατηγορία), often referred to as the Greek Volleyball League, is the highest professional volleyball league in Greece. It is run by the Hellenic Volleyball Federation. It is considered one of the top national leagues in European volleyball, as its clubs have made significant success in European competitions.

== History ==
It was first organized in 1928 as a Panhellenic Championship. In the 1968–69 season, the men's Alpha Ethniki category was created at the men's level, which from 1990–91 to 2009–10 was named A1.

== Current teams ==
Location of 2023–24 Volleyleague Greece teams

The clubs for the 2023–24 season:

Club	Home city	Home ground	Capacity
Athlos Orestiada	Orestiada	Nikos Samaras Indoor Hall	2,500
Flisvos Palaio Faliro	Palaio Faliro	Sofia Befon Palaio Faliro Indoor Hall	1,204
Foinikas Syros	Ermoupolis	Dimitris Vikelas Arena	700
Kifissia	Kifissia, Athens	Zirineio Indoor Hall	800
Milon	Nea Smyrni, Athens	Milon Indoor Hall	1,300
OFI	Heraklion, Crete	Kalamata Coast Indoor Hall	1,000
Olympiacos	Piraeus	Melina Merkouri Rentis Indoor Hall	1,800
Panathinaikos	Athens	Mets Indoor Hall	1,500
Pegasus Polichni	Polichni, Thessaloniki	Alexandros Nikolaidis Polichni Indoor Hall	330
PAOK	Pylaia, Thessaloniki	PAOK Sports Arena	8,500

== Championship history ==
- 1935–36 to 1939–40 and 1960–61 to 1967–68: Panhellenic Championship
- 1968–69 to 1987–88: A Ethniki
- 1988–89 to 2009–10: A1 Ethniki
- 2010–11 to present: Volley League

== Title holders ==
- 1928: Panellinios
- 1935–36: Panellinios
- 1936–37: Panellinios
- 1937–38: EAP
- 1938–39: Panellinios
- 1939–40: Panellinios
- 1940–45: Not held due to WWII
- 1960–61: Panellinios
- 1961–62: Milon
- 1962–63: Panathinaikos
- 1963–64: Milon
- 1964–65: Panathinaikos
- 1965–66: Panathinaikos
- 1966–67: Panathinaikos
- 1967–68: Olympiacos
- 1968–69: Olympiacos
- 1969–70: Panathinaikos
- 1970–71: Panathinaikos
- 1971–72: Panathinaikos
- 1972–73: Panathinaikos
- 1973–74: Olympiacos
- 1974–75: Panathinaikos
- 1975–76: Olympiacos
- 1976–77: Panathinaikos
- 1977–78: Olympiacos
- 1978–79: Olympiacos
- 1979–80: Olympiacos
- 1980–81: Olympiacos
- 1981–82: Panathinaikos
- 1982–83: Olympiacos
- 1983–84: Panathinaikos
- 1984–85: Panathinaikos
- 1985–86: Panathinaikos
- 1986–87: Olympiacos
- 1987–88: Olympiacos
- 1988–89: Olympiacos
- 1989–90: Olympiacos
- 1990–91: Olympiacos
- 1991–92: Olympiacos
- 1992–93: Olympiacos
- 1993–94: Olympiacos
- 1994–95: Panathinaikos
- 1995–96: Panathinaikos
- 1996–97: Aris
- 1997–98: Olympiacos
- 1998–99: Olympiacos
- 1999–00: Olympiacos
- 2000–01: Olympiacos
- 2001–02: Iraklis
- 2002–03: Olympiacos
- 2003–04: Panathinaikos
- 2004–05: Iraklis
- 2005–06: Panathinaikos
- 2006–07: Iraklis
- 2007–08: Iraklis
- 2008–09: Olympiacos
- 2009–10: Olympiacos
- 2010–11: Olympiacos
- 2011–12: Iraklis
- 2012–13: Olympiacos
- 2013–14: Olympiacos
- 2014–15: PAOK
- 2015–16: PAOK
- 2016–17: PAOK
- 2017–18: Olympiacos
- 2018–19: Olympiacos
- 2019–20: Panathinaikos
- 2020–21: Olympiacos
- 2021–22: Panathinaikos
- 2022–23: Olympiacos
- 2023–24: Olympiacos
- 2024–25: Panathinaikos
- 2025–26: Panathinaikos

Source: volleyleague.gr

== A1 Finals ==
Season	Home advantage	Result	Challenger	1st of Regular Season	Record (Points)
1990–91	Olympiacos	3–0	Panathinaikos	Olympiacos	18–0 (36)
1991–92	Olympiacos	2–0	Panathinaikos	Olympiacos	17–1 (35)
1992–93	Olympiacos	4–0	Orestiada	Olympiacos	17–1 (35)
1994–95	Panathinaikos	2–0	Olympiacos	Panathinaikos	19–3 (41)
1995–96	Panathinaikos	3–2	Aris	Panathinaikos	20–2 (42)
1996–97	Aris	3–2	Orestiada	Olympiacos	17–5 (39)
1997–98	Orestiada	2–3	Olympiacos	Orestiada	19–3 (41)
1998–99	Olympiacos	3–0	Iraklis	Olympiacos	20–2 (42)
1999–00	Olympiacos	3–1	Iraklis	Olympiacos	20–2 (42)
2000–01	Olympiacos	3–0	Iraklis	Olympiacos	20–2 (42)
2001–02	Olympiacos	2–3	Iraklis	Olympiacos	19–3 (57)
2002–03	Olympiacos	3–0	Iraklis	Olympiacos	20–2 (58)
2003–04	Olympiacos	1–3	Panathinaikos	Olympiacos	20–2 (59)
2004–05	Iraklis	3–0	Olympiacos	Iraklis	22–0 (63)
2005–06	Panathinaikos	3–1	Iraklis	Panathinaikos	21–1 (60)
2006–07	Panathinaikos	1–3	Iraklis	Panathinaikos	21–1 (63)
2007–08	Panathinaikos	0–3	Iraklis	Panathinaikos	20–2 (61)
2008–09	Panathinaikos	1–3	Olympiacos	Panathinaikos	19–3 (56)
2009–10	Panathinaikos	1–3	Olympiacos	Panathinaikos	19–3 (57)
2010–11	Iraklis	0–3	Olympiacos	Iraklis	17–5 (52)
2011–12	Iraklis	3–2	Foinikas Syros	Iraklis	18–2 (50)
2012–13	Olympiacos	3–1	Pamvohaikos	Olympiacos	20–2 (56)
2013–14	Olympiacos	3–0	Ethnikos Alexandroupolis	Olympiacos	17–5 (52)
2014–15	PAOK	3–0	Olympiacos	PAOK	20–2 (57)
2015–16	Foinikas Syros	1–3	PAOK	Olympiacos	20–2 (59)
2016–17	Olympiacos	2–3	PAOK	Olympiacos	21–1 (62)
2017–18	Olympiacos	3–0	PAOK	Olympiacos	22–0 (66)
2018–19	Olympiacos	3–0	PAOK	Olympiacos	16–2 (46)
2019–20	Olympiacos	0–2	Panathinaikos	Olympiacos	14–2 (41)
2020–21	Olympiacos	r.r.	Foinikas Syros	Olympiacos	13–1 (39)
2021–22	Panathinaikos	r.r.	Olympiacos	PAOK	12–2 (37)
2022–23	Olympiacos	3–1	PAOK	Olympiacos	16–2 (46)
2023–24	Panathinaikos	1–3	Olympiacos	Panathinaikos	15–1 (44)
2024–25	Panathinaikos	3–0	Olympiacos	Panathinaikos	15–3 (44)
2025–26	Panathinaikos	3–1	PAOK	Panathinaikos	

== Performance by club ==
Club	Champions	Winning years
Olympiacos	32	1968, 1969, 1974, 1976, 1978, 1979, 1980, 1981, 1983, 1987, 1988, 1989, 1990, 1991, 1992, 1993, 1994, 1998, 1999, 2000, 2001, 2003, 2009, 2010, 2011, 2013, 2014, 2018, 2019, 2021, 2023, 2024
Panathinaikos	22	1963, 1965, 1966, 1967, 1970, 1971, 1972, 1973, 1975, 1977, 1982, 1984, 1985, 1986, 1995, 1996, 2004, 2006, 2020, 2022, 2025, 2026
Panellinios	6	1928, 1936, 1937, 1939, 1940, 1961
Iraklis	5	2002, 2005, 2007, 2008, 2012
PAOK	3	2015, 2016, 2017
Milon	2	1962, 1964
EAP	1	1938
Aris	1	1997

== Sponsors and supporters ==
- OPAP
- Pame Stoixima
- ERT
- Blue Star Ferries
- Euromedica

== See also ==
- A1 Ethniki Women's Volleyball
- Greek Volley League MVP
