= 2014–15 Volleyleague (Greece) =

2014–15 Greek Volleyleague
- League: Greek Volley League
- Sport: Volleyball
- Teams: 12

Regular Season
- Season champions: PAOK
- Season MVP: (Venezuela) Ernardo Gómez
- Top scorer: (Venezuela) Ernardo Gómez 694 points

Finals
- Champions: PAOK
- Runners-up: Olympiacos

Greek Volleyleague seasons
- ← 2013–14 2015–16 →

The 2014–15 Greek Volleyleague season was the 47th season of the Greek Volleyleague, the highest tier professional volley league in Greece. The winner of the league was PAOK, which beat Olympiacos in the league's playoff's finals. It was the first championship of PAOK. The clubs M.E.N.T. and AEK Athens were relegated to the Greek A2 League. The MVP of the league was Ernardo Gómez, player of PAOK.

== Teams ==
Location of teams in Greek Volleyball League 2014-15

Club	Home city
AEK Athens	Athens
Aris Thessaloniki	Thessaloniki
Ethnikos Alexandroupolis	Alexandroupoli
Foinikas Syros	Ermoupolis
Kifissia	Kifissia, Athens
Lamia	Lamia
M.E.N.T.	Thessaloniki
Olympiacos	Piraeus
Orestiada	Orestiada
Pamvohaikos	Vrachati
Panathinaikos	Athens
PAOK	Thessaloniki

== Regular season ==
Pos	Team	Pts	Pld	W	L	Set		Result
1	PAOK	57	22	20	2	64–21	3,05	Play off places 1–4
2	Olympiacos	53	22	19	3	61–25	2,44	Play off places 1–4
3	Foinikas Syros	43	22	13	9	50–32	1,56	Play off places 1–4
4	Panathinaikos	43	22	14	8	52–35	1,49	Play off places 1–4
5	Kifissia	41	22	13	9	50–36	1,39	Play off places 5–8
6	Ethnikos Alexandroupolis	40	22	12	10	49–36	1,36	Play off places 5–8
7	Pamvohaikos	29	22	10	12	38–44	0,86	Play off places 5–8
8	Orestiada	25	22	9	13	32–49	0,65	Play off places 5–8
9	Aris Thessaloniki	23	22	8	14	31–48	0,65	
10	M.E.N.T.	16	22	5	17	23–56	0,41	Play out
11	Lamia	15	22	5	17	24–56	0,43	Play out
12	AEK Athens	11	22	4	18	22–58	0,38	Play out

Source: volleyleague.gr

== Play-out ==
Pos	Team	Pts	Pld	W	L	Set
1	Lamia	26	4	4	0	12–2
2	M.E.N.T.	23	4	2	2	8–7
3	AEK Athens	11	4	0	4	1–12

== Play-off (5-8) ==
Semifinals
5	Kifissia	3
8	Orestiada	0
6	Ethnikos	3
7	Pamvohaikos	0

Finals
5	Kifissia	2
6	Ethnikos	0

== Play-off (1-4) ==
Semifinals
1	PAOK	3
4	Panathinaikos	2
2	Olympiacos	3
3	Foinikas Syros	1

Finals
1	PAOK	3
3	Olympiacos	0

== Final standings ==
Pos	Team	Results
1	PAOK	Champions League 2015–16
2	Olympiacos	CEV Cup 2015–16
3	Foinikas Syros	CEV Cup 2015–16
4	Panathinaikos	
5	Kifissia	
6	Ethnikos Alexandroupolis	Challenge Cup 2015–16
7	Pamvohaikos	
8	Orestiada	
9	Aris Thessaloniki	
10	Lamia	
11	M.E.N.T.	Relegated to A2
12	AEK Athens	Relegated to A2
