= 2015–16 Volleyleague (Greece) =

2015–16 Greek Volleyleague
- League: Greek Volley League
- Sport: Volleyball
- Duration: 31 October 2015 – 1 April 2016 (regular season); 6 – 28 April (playoffs)
- Teams: 12
- TV partner: Nova Sports

Regular Season
- Season champions: Olympiacos
- Season MVP: (Cuba) Rolando Cepeda
- Top scorer: (Cuba) Rolando Cepeda 725 points

Finals
- Champions: PAOK (2nd title)
- Runners-up: Foinikas Syros

Greek Volleyleague seasons
- ← 2014–15 2016–17 →

The 2015–16 Greek Volleyleague season is the 48th season of the Greek Volleyleague, the highest tier professional volley league in Greece. The winner of the league was PAOK, which beat Foinikas Syros 3–1 in the league's playoff's finals. It was the second championship of PAOK. The clubs Aris Thessaloniki and Lamia were relegated to the A2 Ethniki.

== Teams ==
12 teams participate in the 2015–16 Volleyleague.

- The 10 highest ranked teams from the 2014–15 Volleyleague final standings: PAOK, Olympiacos, Foinikas Syros, Panathinaikos, Kifissia, Ethnikos Alexandroupolis, Pamvohaikos, Orestiada, Aris and Lamia.
- The 2 promoted teams from the A2 Ethniki 2014–15: Iraklis and Panachaiki.
2015-16 Volleyleague season club locations

Club	Ap.	Home city
Aris Thessaloniki	46	Thessaloniki
Ethnikos Alexandroupolis	38	Alexandroupoli
Foinikas Syros	7	Ermoupolis
Iraklis	45	Thessaloniki
Kifissia	15	Kifissia, Athens
Lamia	11	Lamia
Olympiacos	48	Piraeus
Orestiada	23	Orestiada
Pamvohaikos	5	Vrachati
Panachaiki	2	Patras
Panathinaikos	48	Athens
PAOK	37	Thessaloniki

== Regular season ==
=== League table ===
Pos	Team	Pld	W	L	Pts	SW	SL	SR	SPW	SPL	SPR	Qualification or relegation
1	Olympiacos Piraeus	22	20	2	59	63	13	4.846	1834	1490	1.231	Playoffs
2	Kifissia	22	17	5	51	59	28	2.107	2042	1822	1.121	Playoffs
3	Foinikas Syros	22	16	6	47	53	29	1.828	1925	1743	1.104	Playoffs
4	PAOK Thessaloniki	22	16	6	44	52	28	1.857	1848	1668	1.108	Playoffs
5	Panathinaikos	22	13	9	36	45	39	1.154	1881	1861	1.011	
6	Pamvohaikos	22	9	13	31	41	45	0.911	1925	1945	0.990	
7	Ethnikos Alexandroupoli	22	9	13	28	38	50	0.760	1849	1937	0.955	
8	Panachaiki	22	9	13	25	34	49	0.694	1770	1898	0.933	
9	Orestiada	22	8	14	25	33	51	0.647	1778	1890	0.941	
10	Iraklis Thessaloniki	22	7	15	24	34	52	0.654	1816	1979	0.918	
11	Aris Thessaloniki	22	6	16	17	30	56	0.536	1810	1962	0.923	Relegated to A2 Ethniki
12	Lamia	22	2	20	9	18	60	0.300	1563	1846	0.847	Relegated to A2 Ethniki

Source: volleyleague.gr

=== Results ===
Home \ Away	ARI	ETH	FNS	IRA	KIF	LAM	OLY	ORE	PVH	PNC	PAO	PAOK
Aris		3–2	3–0	1–3	2–3	3–0	2–3	1–3	3–2	1–3	1–3	1–3
Ethnikos Alexandroupolis	3–0		3–1	3–0	0–3	3–1	0–3	1–3	0–3	3–2	2–3	2–3
Foinikas Syros	3–0	3–0		3–2	1–3	3–1	3–2	3–1	3–1	3–0	3–1	3–1
Iraklis	2–3	2–3	0–3		2–3	3–1	0–3	3–2	1–3	1–3	3–0	0–3
Kifissia	3–0	3–0	3–1	3–0		3–0	2–3	3–0	3–0	3–1	3–1	2–3
Lamia	3–0	1–3	1–3	2–3	2–3		0–3	2–3	0–3	3–0	0–3	0–3
Olympiacos	3–0	3–0	3–0	3–0	1–3	3–0		3–0	3–0	3–0	3–0	3–0
Orestiada	3–0	2–3	1–3	0–3	3–1	3–1	0–3		3–1	2–3	3–2	0–3
Pamvohaikos	2–3	2–3	0–3	1–3	3–2	3–0	0–3	3–0		3–1	2–3	3–1
Panachaiki	3–2	3–2	0–3	3–1	1–3	3–0	1–3	3–1	1–3		3–0	0–3
Panathinaikos	3–1	3–2	3–2	3–0	3–1	3–0	1–3	3–0	3–1	3–0		1–3
PAOK	3–0	3–0	0–3	3–2	1–3	3–0	1–3	3–0	3–2	3–0	3–0	

Legend: Blue = home team win; Red = away team win.

== Play-off (1-4) ==
The four teams that finished in the places 1 to 4 in the Regular season, compete in the Play-off (1-4).

Semifinals
1	Olympiacos	1	2	3	1
4	PAOK	3	3	2	3
2	Kifissia	3	2	0	2
3	Foinikas Syros	2	3	3	3

Finals
3	Foinikas Syros	0	1	3	2
4	PAOK	3	3	1	3

=== Semi-finals ===
In the Playoff's semi-finals, the team that finished in the 1st place in the Regular season plays against the 4th and the 2nd placed team plays against the 3rd. To qualify to the Final the teams must win three games. The teams that finished 1st and 2nd in the Regular season, will be played the first, the second and the fifth (if it is necessary) game of the series at home.

==== Olympiacos – PAOK (1–3) ====
Date	Time		Score		Set 1	Set 2	Set 3	Set 4	Set 5	Total	Report
6 Apr	20:30	Olympiacos	1–3	PAOK	19–25	25–20	24–26	20–25	—	88–96	Report
8 Apr	18:00	Olympiacos	2–3	PAOK	27–25	25–21	20–25	20–25	14–16	106–112	Report
11 Apr	20:30	PAOK	2–3	Olympiacos	25–21	24–26	25–23	17–25	8–15	99–110	Report
13 Apr	18:00	PAOK	3–1	Olympiacos	22–25	25–23	25–22	25–18	—	97–88	Report

==== Kifissia – Foinikas Syros (1–3) ====
Date	Time		Score		Set 1	Set 2	Set 3	Set 4	Set 5	Total	Report
6 Apr	18:00	Kifissia	3–2	Foinikas Syros	25–22	20–25	25–19	23–25	15–12	108–103	Report
8 Apr	20:30	Kifissia	2–3	Foinikas Syros	25–18	22–25	17–25	27–25	7–15	98–108	Report
11 Apr	18:00	Foinikas Syros	3–0	Kifissia	25–17	25–15	25–23	—	—	75–55	Report
13 Apr	20:30	Foinikas Syros	3–2	Kifissia	26–28	25–23	20–25	25–22	15–7	111–105	Report

=== Final ===
In the Playoff's final the two qualified teams play against each other in a series where the team winning three games will become the 2015–16 Volleyleague championship. The team that finished in the higher Regular season place will be played the first, the third and the fifth (if it is necessary) game of the series at home.

==== Foinikas Syros – PAOK (1–3) ====
Date	Time		Score		Set 1	Set 2	Set 3	Set 4	Set 5	Total	Report
19 Apr	19:00	Foinikas Syros	0–3	PAOK	22–25	23–25	14–25	—	—	59–75	Report
22 Apr	19:00	PAOK	3–1	Foinikas Syros	25–21	17–25	25–23	25–18	—	92–87	Report
25 Apr	19:00	Foinikas Syros	3–1	PAOK	35–33	20–25	26–24	25–20	—	106–102	Report
28 Apr	19:00	PAOK	3–2	Foinikas Syros	21–25	21–25	25–16	25–14	15–10	107–90	Report

== Final standings ==
Qualified for the 2016–17 CEV Champions League
Qualified for the 2016–17 CEV Cup
Qualified for the 2016–17 CEV Challenge Cup
Relegated to the 2016–17 A2 Ethniki

Rank	Team
1st place, gold medalist(s)	PAOK Thessaloniki
2nd place, silver medalist(s)	Foinikas Syros
3rd place, bronze medalist(s)	Olympiacos Piraeus
4	Kifissia
5	Panathinaikos Athens
6	Pamvohaikos Vocha
7	Ethnikos Alexandroupolis
8	Panachaiki
9	Orestiada
10	Iraklis Thessaloniki
11	Aris Thessaloniki
12	Lamia
