= Nikolaos Smaragdis =

Greek volleyball player (born 1982)

Nikos Smaragdis

Personal information
- Full name: Nikolaos Smaragdis
- Nationality: Greek
- Born: 12 February 1982 (age 44); Thessaloniki, Greece
- Height: 202 cm (6 ft 8 in)
- Weight: 89 kg (196 lb)
- Spike: 328 cm (129 in)
- Block: 318 cm (125 in)

Volleyball information
- Position: Middle-blocker

Career
Years	Teams
1996–1999; 1999–2003; 2003–2006; 2006–2009; 2009–2010; 2010–2012; 2012–2015; 2015; 2015–2017; 2018; 2018–2019	(Greece) Aris Thessaloniki (Greece) P.A.O.K. Thessaloniki (Greece) Panathinaikos Athens (Greece) Iraklis Thessaloniki (Greece) Panathinaikos Athens (Greece) Iraklis Thessaloniki (Greece) Olympiacos Piraeus (Greece) Foinikas Syros (Greece) P.A.O.K. Thessaloniki (Greece) Iraklis Thessaloniki (Greece) Olympiacos Piraeus

National team
Greece - 195 caps

Nikolaos "Nikos" Smaragdis (Greek: Νικόλαος «Νίκος» Σμαραγδής; born 12 February 1982) is a Greek volleyball player. He has been capped 195 times with Greece national team.

== Career ==
Smaragdis has won the Hellenic Championship 10 times. He is the only Greek Volleyball player to have achieved this, with four clubs.

== International career ==
Smaragdis was part of the Greece men's national volleyball team at the 2006 FIVB Volleyball Men's World Championship in Japan.

== Sporting achievements ==
=== Clubs ===
==== International competitions ====
- 2008/2009 CEV Champions League, with Iraklis Thessaloniki
- 2005/2006 CEV Cup, with Panathinaikos Athens

==== Hellenic championships ====
- 2003/2004 Hellenic Championship, with Panathinaikos Athens
- 2004/2005 Hellenic Championship, with Panathinaikos Athens
- 2005/2006 Hellenic Championship, with Panathinaikos Athens
- 2006/2007 Hellenic Championship, with Iraklis Thessaloniki
- 2007/2008 Hellenic Championship, with Iraklis Thessaloniki
- 2009/2010 Hellenic Championship, with Panathinaikos Athens
- 2010/2011 Hellenic Championship, with Iraklis Thessaloniki
- 2011/2012 Hellenic Championship, with Iraklis Thessaloniki
- 2012/2013 Hellenic Championship, with Olympiacos Piraeus
- 2013/2014 Hellenic Championship, with Olympiacos Piraeus
- 2015/2016 Hellenic Championship, with P.A.O.K. Thessaloniki
- 2016/2017 Hellenic Championship, with P.A.O.K. Thessaloniki
- 2018/2019 Hellenic Championship, with Olympiacos Piraeus

==== Hellenic Cup ====
- 2005/2006 Hellenic Cup, with Panathinaikos Athens
- 2009/2010 Hellenic Cup, with Panathinaikos Athens
- 2010/2011 Hellenic Cup, with Iraklis Thessaloniki
- 2011/2012 Hellenic Cup, with Iraklis Thessaloniki
- 2012/2013 Hellenic Cup, with Olympiacos Piraeus
- 2013/2014 Hellenic Cup, with Olympiacos Piraeus
- 2017/2018 Hellenic Cup, with Iraklis Thessaloniki

==== Hellenic League Cup ====
- 2012/2013 Hellenic League Cup, with Olympiacos Piraeus
- 2018/2019 Hellenic League Cup, with Olympiacos Piraeus

==== Hellenic Super Cup ====
- 2007 Hellenic Super Cup, with Iraklis Thessaloniki
- 2008 Hellenic Super Cup, with Iraklis Thessaloniki
