= Ernardo Gómez =

Venezuelan volleyball player

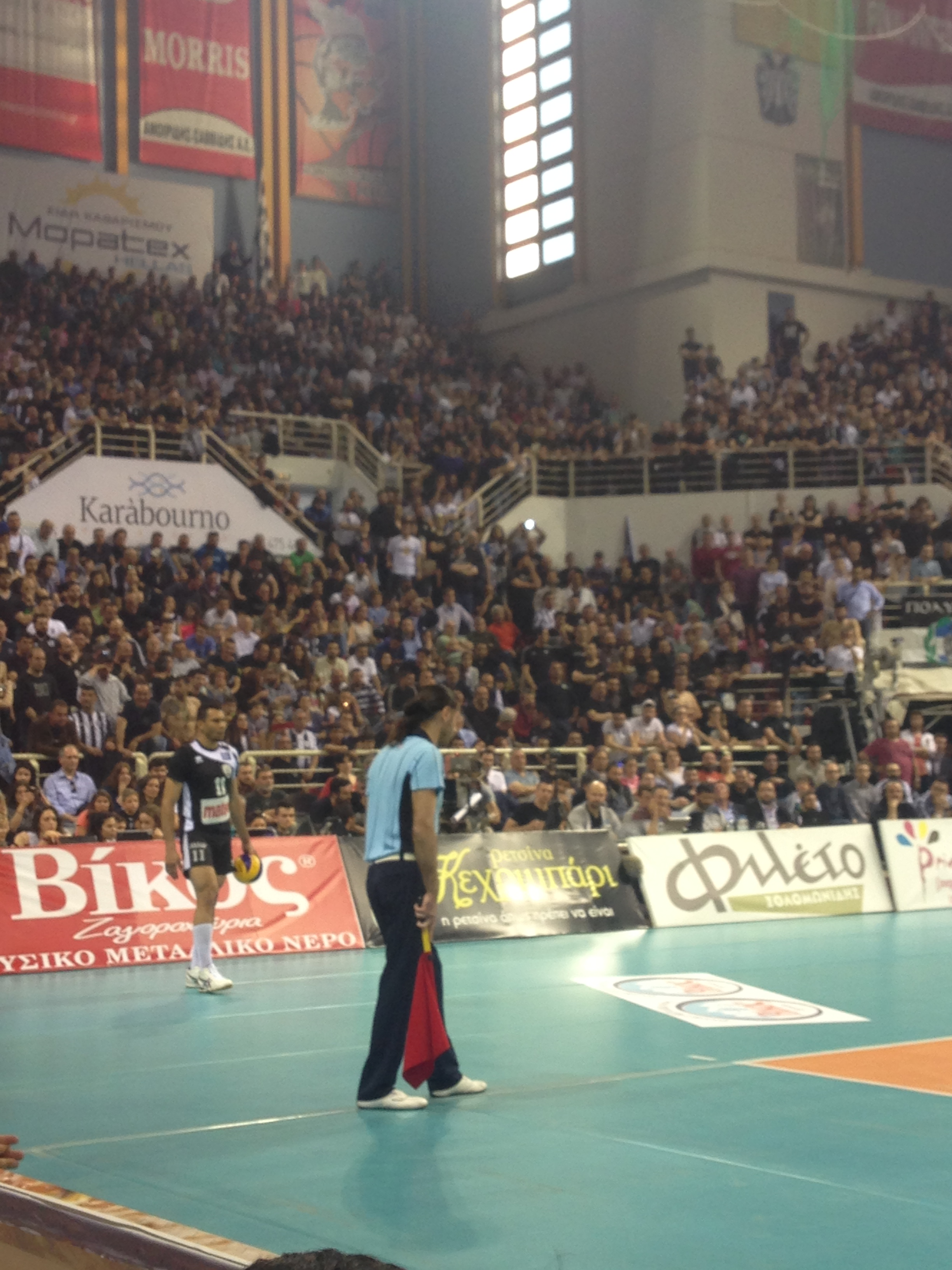
- Ernardo Gomez at the 2015 Greek Volleyleague Finals

Personal information
- Born: 30 July 1982 (age 44); Ciudad Bolívar, Venezuela
- Height: 1.95 m (6 ft 5 in)
- Weight: 90 kg (198 lb)
- Spike: 363 cm (143 in)
- Block: 345 cm (136 in)

Career
Years	Teams
1998–1999	(Venezuela) Huracanes de Bolivar
1999–2000	(Brazil) Ulbra
2000–2004	(Greece) Olympiacos
2004–2005	(Japan) Toyoda Gosei Trefuerza
2005–2007	(Greece) Panathinaikos
2007–2008	(Turkey) Fenerbahçe
2008–2012	(Japan) JT Thunders
2012–2013	(Turkey) Ziraat Bankasi Ankara
2013–2014	(Venezuela) Huracanes de Bolivar
2014–2015	(Greece) PAOK Thessaloniki
2015–2016	(Turkey) Inegöl Belediyesi
2016–2017	(Greece) PAOK Thessaloniki
2017–2018	(Greece) Iraklis Chalkidas
2018–2019	(Israel) Hapoel Kfar Saba
2019–2020	(United Arab Emirates) Al Ain
2020	(Saudi Arabia) Al Wehda

National team
2001–2014	Venezuela
Honours
Men's volleyball
Representing Venezuela
Pan American Games
Gold medal – first place	2003 Santo Domingo	Team

Ernardo "Harry" Andrés Gómez Cañas (born July 30, 1982, in Bolívar) is a Venezuelan former professional volleyball player, who won the gold medal with the Venezuela national team at the 2003 Pan American Games in Santo Domingo, Dominican Republic.

He is 195 cm and 100 kg weight. He played over 300 times for his national team. He also played for Fenerbahçe Istanbul in Turkey, Ulbra in Brazil, Olympiacos Piraeus, Panathinaikos VC and PAOK Thessaloniki, in Greece and Toyoda Gosei Trefuerza in Japan.

At 20 years of age, Gómez was a regular starter Venezuela's national team. He began his international career at age 13 and is known for his offensive play from both the front and back rows, as well as his serving. He is often referred to by the nickname "Harry."

Standing at only 195 cm tall‚ Gomez has never come up short on court. He was the best scorer of the Intercontinental Rounds of the 2001 World League and has picked up a silver medal at the FIVB Youth World Championship in Saudi Arabia in 1999‚ a bronze medal at the Junior FIVB WCH in Poland in 2001‚ and two fourth places in Bahrain 1997 and Thailand 1999.

He won with his team the gold medal at the 2005 Bolivarian Games.

He was part of the Venezuela men's national volleyball team at the 2014 FIVB Volleyball Men's World Championship in Poland. He played for Toyoda Gosei Trefuerza.

== Sporting achievements ==
=== Club ===
==== National Championships ====
- 2000/2001 Greek Championship with Olympiacos
- 2002/2003 Greek Championship with Olympiacos
- 2005/2006 Greek Championship with Panathinaikos
- 2007/2008 Turkish Championship with Fenerbahçe
- 2014/2015 Greek Championship with PAOK
- 2016/2017 Greek Championship with PAOK

==== National Cups ====
- 2000/2001 Greek Cup, with Olympiacos
- 2007/2008 Turkish Cup, with Fenerbahce
- 2014/2015 Greek Cup, with PAOK

==== National Super Cups ====
- 2000 Greek Super Cup, with Olympiacos
- 2006 Greek Super Cup, with Panathinaikos

=== Individually ===
- 2001–02 CEV Champions League Top Scorer'
- 2003–04 Greek Championship MVP
- 2005–06 Greek Championship MVP
- 2007–08 Turkish Championship MVP
- 2007–08 Turkish Championship Top scorer
- 2009–10 Japanese Championship Top scorer
- 2014–15 Greek Championship MVP

== Awards ==
- YOUNG WORLD CHAMPIONSHIP SAUDI ARABIA MVP 1999
- JUNIOR WORLD CHAMPIONSHIP POLAND MVP 2001
- World League 2001 Best Scorer of International Round
- Pan Americans Games Santo Domingo 2003 Gold Medal and MVP
- Olympics Games Beijing 2008 China 9 Places and Best Scorer of Qualifications Round
- Fenerbahce 2007-08 Doble title Cup and League champions (Best Scorer and MVP)
- 3 TIME MVP OF GREEK LEAGUE 2001, 2006, 2015
- Toyoda Gosei 2004-05 7 Places and Best Scorer with the Record in the League with 711 points in 28 Games,
- JT Thunders 2008 6 Places and Best Scorer
- JT Thunders 2009 5 Places and silver medal in the Emperator Cup and MVP
- JT Thunders 2010 5 Places and Best Scorer and Best Server
- JT Thunders 2011 6 Places

=== National team ===
- Young World Championship Silver Medal and MVP
- Junior World Championship Bronze Medal and MVP

=== Senior team ===
- American Cup Argentina 1998 6 Places
- American Cup USA 1999 6 Places
- American Cup Brazil 2000 5 Places

Pan American Games Winnipeg 1999 Canada 4 Place

World League 2001 Best scorer of International Round 2002, 2003, 2007, 2008 World Championship Argentina 2002 Pan Americans Games Santo Domingo 2003 Gold Medal and MVP

- 2005 Bolivarian Games, - Gold Medal

World Championship Japan 2006 Pan American Games Rio Brazil 2007 4 Places Sud American Championship Rio Brasil 2007 World Cup Japan 2007 Olympics Games Beijing 2008 China 9 Places and Best Scorer of Qualifications Round Center American and Caribbeans Games Mayagues Puerto Rico 2010 Silver Medal World Championship Poland 2014

Brazilian League Ulbra 2000 4 places

=== lleyLeague ===
- ).

Turkish League Fenerbahce 2007-08 Doble Title Cup and League Champions, Best Scorer and MVP Ziraat Bank 2012 9 Places Inegol Belediye Sport Club 2015–16

Japanese V-League Toyoda Gosei 2004-05 7 Places and Best scorer with the record in the league with 711 Points in 28 Games. JT Thunders 2008 6 Places and Best Scorer, 2009 5 Places and silver medal in the Emperator cup, 2010 5 Places and Best Scorer and Best Server, 2011 6 Places
