= Ilias Lappas =

Greek volleyball player (born 1979)

Personal information
- Nationality: Greek
- Born: 20 July 1979 (age 47); Athens
- Height: 1.95 m (6 ft 5 in)
- Weight: 92 kg (203 lb)
- Spike: 335 cm (132 in)
- Block: 320 cm (130 in)

Volleyball information
- Position: Outside hitter
- Current club: AONS Milon
- Number: 15

Career
Years	Teams
1997–2001; 2001–2002; 2002–2003; 2003–2004; 2004–2011; 2011–2016; 2016–2017; 2017–2019; 2019–2020; 2020–	Panellinios; AEK; Aris; PAOK; Panathinaikos; Foinikas Syros; Kifissia; AEK; Pamvohaikos; Milon

National team
2001–2014	Greece (192)

Ilias Lappas (born 20 July 1979) is a former Greek male volleyball player. He was part of the Greece men's national volleyball team. He competed with the national team at the 2004 Summer Olympics in Athens, Greece. On club level, he plays for AONS Milon.

== See also ==
- Greece at the 2004 Summer Olympics
