= Dimitrios Gkaras =

Greek volleyball player (born 1985)

Dimitris Gkaras

Personal information
- Full name: Dimitrios Gkaras
- Nationality: Greek
- Born: 12 November 1985 (age 40); Orestiada, Greece
- Height: 185 cm (6 ft 1 in)
- Weight: 74 kg (163 lb)
- Spike: 282 cm (111 in)
- Block: 280 cm (110 in)

Volleyball information
- Position: Libero
- Current club: Olympiacos

Career
| Years | Teams |
|---|---|
| 2004–2006; 2006–2007; 2007–2009; 2009–2010; 2010–2012; 2012–2013; 2013–2014; 2014–2017; 2017–2018; 2018–2019; 2019–2020; 2020–2021; 2021–2022; 2022– | (Greece) Orestiada (Greece) Arostotelis Skydras (Greece) Lamia (Greece) EA Patras (Greece) Lamia (Greece) Foinikas Syros (Greece) Aris (Greece) PAOK (Greece) Pamvohaikos (Greece) AEK (Greece) OFI (Greece) Foinikas Syros (Greece) Panathinaikos (Greece) Olympiacos |

National team
| 2011– | Greece |

Dimitris Gkaras (Greek: Δημήτρης Γκαράς; born 12 November 1985) is a Greek male volleyball player. He is part of the Greece men's national volleyball team. On club level he last played for Olympiacos.

== Sporting achievements ==
=== Clubs ===
- National championships
  - 2014/2015 Greek Championship, with PAOK
  - 2014/2015 Greek Cup, with PAOK
  - 2015/2016 Greek Championship, with PAOK
  - 2016/2017 Greek Championship, with PAOK
  - 2021/2022 Greek Championship, with Panathinaikos
  - 2021/2022 Greek League Cup, with Panathinaikos
- CEV Competitions
  - 2022–23 CEV Challenge Cup, with Olympiacos Piraeus
