= Greek Volley League MVP =

Annual volleyball award

The Greek Volley League MVP is the yearly MVP award for the best player of Greek Volleyleague, the Greek first tier professional championship. It begin with 1998–99 season and first winner was Marios Giourdas. The recordman of this award is Ernardo Gómez who has won the MVP award three times. Marios Giourdas and Andrej Kravárik has won two times.

== Winners ==
MVP
| Year | Winner | Team |
|---|---|---|
| 1999 | (Greece) Marios Giourdas | Olympiacos |
| 2000 | (Greece) Georgios Dragovits | Olympiacos |
| 2001 | (Slovakia) Andrej Kravárik | Iraklis |
| 2002 | (Greece) Theodoros Baev | Iraklis |
| 2003 | (Greece) Marios Giourdas (2) | Olympiacos |
| 2004 | (Bulgaria) Plamen Konstantinov (Venezuela) Ernardo Gómez | Panathinaikos; Olympiacos |
| 2005 | (United States) Lloy Ball | Iraklis |
| 2006 | (Venezuela) Ernardo Gómez (2) | Panathinaikos |
| 2007 | (Belgium) Frank Depestele | Iraklis |
| 2008 | (Sweden) Marcus Nilsson | Iraklis |
| 2009 | (Greece) Mitar Tzourits | Olympiacos |
| 2010 | (Serbia) Ivan Miljković | Olympiacos |
| 2011 | (Cuba) Rolando Despaigne | Olympiacos |
| 2012 | (Greece) Andrej Kravárik (2) | Iraklis |
| 2013 | (Bulgaria) Boyan Yordanov | Olympiacos |
| 2014 | (Greece) Konstantinos Christofidelis | Olympiacos |
| 2015 | (Venezuela) Ernardo Gómez (3) | PAOK |
| 2016 | (Cuba) Rolando Cepeda | PAOK |
| 2017 | (Israel) Alexander Shafranovich | PAOK |
| 2018 | (Bulgaria) Todor Aleksiev | Olympiacos |
| 2019 | (Netherlands) Jeroen Rauwerdink | Olympiacos |
| 2020 | (Greece) Alexandros Raptis | Panathinaikos |
| 2021 | (Greece) Konstantinos Stivachtis | Olympiacos |
| 2022 | (Denmark) Axel Jacobsen | Panathinaikos |
| 2023 | (Slovenia) Alen Pajenk | Olympiacos |
| 2024 | (Greece) Mitar Tzourits (2) | Olympiacos |
| 2025 | (Denmark) Rasmus Breuning Nielsen | Panathinaikos |
| 2026 | (Italy) Luca Spirito | Panathinaikos |
