= Apostolos Armenakis =

Greek volleyball player (born 1980)

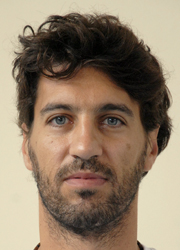
- Portrait of Apostolos Armenakis

Personal information
- Nationality: Greek
- Born: 19 July 1980 (age 46); Thessaloniki, Greece
- Hometown: Thessaloniki
- Height: 205 cm (6 ft 9 in)
- Weight: 91 kg (201 lb)
- Spike: 358 cm (141 in)
- Block: 341 cm (134 in)

Volleyball information
- Position: Middle blocker
- Current club: Olympiacos SF Piraeus
- Number: 19

Career
Years	Teams
1993–1995; 1995–1999; 1999–2002; 2002–2003; 2003–2004; 2004–2005; 2005–2006; 2006; 11.06-2007; 2007–2008; 2008-01.09; 2009; 2009–2010; 2010–2011; 2011–2013; 2013–2014; 2014–2015; 2015–2016; 2016–2017; 2017–01.20; 2020; 2020–2021; 2021–2022; 2022–01.25; 2025–	PAOK Thessaloniki; HAN Thessaloniki; PAOK Thessaloniki; Olympias Patras; PAOK Thessaloniki; AE Nikaia; Olympiacos Piraeus; Stilcasa Volley Taviano; PAOK Thessaloniki; E.A. Patras; PAOK Thessaloniki; AS Cannes; E.A. Patras; Al-Nasr VC Dubai; PAOK Thessaloniki; Aris Thessaloniki; Azzurra Alessano; Anagenissi Deryneia; ACH Volley Ljubljana; Iraklis Thessaloniki; PAOK Thessaloniki; Pierikos Katerini; Aristotelis Skydra; Pegasus Polichni; Olympiacos Piraeus

National team
2005–2015	Greece
- Last updated: 21 April 2025

Apostolos Armenakis (born 19 July 1980) is a Greek male volleyball player. He was part of the Greece men's national volleyball team. On club level, he played in the first round of the 2024–25 season with Pegasus Polichni and then with Olympiacos Piraeus in Hellenic Volley League.

== Sporting achievements ==
=== Clubs ===
- MEVZA League
  - 2016/2017 - with ACH Volley Ljubljana
- National championships
  - 2005/2006 Hellenic Championship, with Olympiacos Piraeus
  - 2012/2013 Hellenic Championship, with P.A.O.K. Thessaloniki
  - 2016/2017 Slovenian Championship, with ACH Volley Ljubljana
  - 2019/2020 Hellenic Championship, with P.A.O.K. Thessaloniki
- National cups
  - 2005 Hellenic Super Cup, with Olympiacos Piraeus
  - 2008 Hellenic Cup, with E.A. Patras
  - 2017 Slovenian Cup, with ACH Volley Ljubljana
  - 2018 Hellenic Cup, with Iraklis Thessaloniki
  - 2018 Hellenic Cup, with Iraklis Thessaloniki
  - 2024 Hellenic Super Cup, with Olympiacos Piraeus
  - 2025 Hellenic Cup, with Olympiacos Piraeus
