= Michalis Alexandropoulos =

Greek volleyball and beach volleyball player

Personal information
- Nationality: Greek
- Born: 25 January 1972 (age 54); Kinshasa, Zaire

Volleyball information
- Position: Middle blocker

Career
Years	Teams
1985–1992; 1992–1993; 1993–1999; 1999–2000; 2000–2002; 2002–2005; 2005–2006; 2006–2007; 2007–2008; 2008–2009; 2009–2010; 2010–2011; 2011–2012	(Greece) Aris Thessaloniki (Greece) Serres (Greece) Aris Thessaloniki (Greece) P.A.O.K Thessaloniki (Greece) Aris Thessaloniki (Greece) Olympiacos Piraeus (Greece) Panellinios (Greece) Pagrati (Greece) Korinthos (Greece) Pannaxiakos (Greece) G.E. Messinias (Greece) ASP Metamorfosis (Greece) AEK Athens

Michalis Alexandropoulos (Greek: Μιχάλης Αλεξανδρόπουλος, born 25 January 1972 in Kinshasa) is a retired Greek male indoor volleyball and beach volleyball player. As an indoor volleyball player, he played most notably for Olympiacos (2002–2005), with whom he won 1 Greek Championship (2002−03) and the 2005 CEV Top Teams Cup and for Aris Thessaloniki (1985–1992, 1993–1999, 2000–2002), with whom he won 1 Greek Championship (1996–97) and 1 Greek Super Cup (1997). Alexandropoulos had 16 caps with Greece men's national volleyball team.

As a beach volleyball player he has won 2 Greek Championships (2000 with teammate Ilias Arabatzis, 2004 with teammate Giorgos Koulieris).
