= 2016–17 Volleyleague (Greece) =

2016–17 Greek Volleyleague
- League: Greek Volley League
- Sport: Volleyball
- Duration: 22 October 2016 – 25 March 2017 (regular season)
- Teams: 12
- TV partner: Nova Sports

Regular Season
- Season MVP: (Israel) Alexander Shafranovich
- Top scorer: (Bulgaria) Boyan Yordanov 593 points

Finals
- Champions: PAOK (3rd title)
- Runners-up: Olympiacos

Greek Volleyleague seasons
- ← 2015–16 2017–18 →

The 2016–17 Greek Volleyleague is the 49th season of the Greek Volleyleague, the highest tier professional volley league in Greece. The defending champion is PAOK.

== Teams ==
2016–17 Volleyleague season club locations

12 teams participate in the 2016–17 Volleyleague.

- The 10 highest ranked teams from the 2015–16 Volleyleague final standings: PAOK, Foinikas Syros, Olympiacos, Kifissia, Panathinaikos, Pamvohaikos, Ethnikos Alexandroupolis, Panachaiki, Orestiada, Iraklis Thessaloniki.
- The 2 promoted teams from the A2 Ethniki 2015–16: Iraklis Chalkidas and Kyzikos.

Club	Ap.	Home city
Kyzikos Neas Peramou	1	Nea Peramos
Ethnikos Alexandroupolis	39	Alexandroupoli
Foinikas Syros	8	Ermoupolis
Iraklis	46	Thessaloniki
Kifissia	16	Kifissia, Athens
Iraklis Chalkidas	1	Chalkida
Olympiacos	49	Piraeus
Orestiada	24	Orestiada
Pamvohaikos	6	Vrachati
Panachaiki	3	Patras
Panathinaikos	49	Athens
PAOK	38	Thessaloniki

== Regular season ==
The Regular season of the 2016–17 Volleyleague Greece is held in a round robin format. At season finish, teams occupying positions 1–8 advance to 2016–17 Volleyleague Play-offs, while teams occupying positions 9–12 advance to 2016–17 Volleyleague Greece Play-outs.

=== League table ===
Pos	Team	Pld	W	L	Pts	SW	SL	SR	SPW	SPL	SPR	Qualification
1	Olympiacos Piraeus	22	21	1	62	65	14	4.643	1907	1561	1.222	Playoffs
2	PAOK Thessaloniki	22	18	4	53	60	23	2.609	1942	1705	1.139	Playoffs
3	Panathinaikos	22	17	5	50	58	27	2.148	2010	1736	1.158	Playoffs
4	Pamvohaikos	22	14	8	39	45	36	1.250	1813	1754	1.034	Playoffs
5	Kifisia	22	11	11	39	45	39	1.154	1937	1891	1.024	Playoffs
6	Foinikas Syros	22	12	10	37	51	42	1.214	2090	1974	1.059	Playoffs
7	Ethnikos Alexandroupoli	22	12	10	36	43	38	1.132	1772	1772	1.000	Playoffs
8	Iraklis Thessaloniki	22	9	13	28	33	48	0.688	1730	1877	0.922	Playoffs
9	Iraklis Chalkidas	22	6	16	16	28	53	0.528	1722	1897	0.908	Playouts
10	Panachaiki	22	5	17	16	30	56	0.536	1812	1986	0.912	Playouts
11	Kyzikos Nea Peramos	22	5	17	14	24	56	0.429	1700	1885	0.902	Playouts
12	Orestiada	22	2	20	7	12	62	0.194	1409	1806	0.780	Playouts

Source: Volleyleague.gr Archived 2016-10-31 at the Wayback Machine

=== Results ===
Home \ Away	ETH	FNS	IRC	IRA	KIF	KYZ	OLY	ORE	PVH	PNC	PAO	PAOK
Ethnikos Alexandroupoli		3–0	3–1	3–0	3–2	3–2	0–3	3–0	0–3	3–1	2–3	1–3
Foinikas Syros	1–3		3–0	3–0	3–2	3–1	2–3	3–0	2–3	3–0	3–2	2–3
Iraklis Chalkidas	1–3	1–3		3–1	1–3	1–3	1–3	3–0	1–3	3–0	0–3	1–3
Iraklis	3–1	3–1	3–1		1–3	3–1	0–3	3–1	0–3	3–1	0–3	1–3
Kifissia	0–3	2–3	2–3	3–0		3–1	0–3	3–0	3–0	3–1	3–1	2–3
Kyzikos Nea Peramos	0–3	3–2	3–0	1–3	1–3		0–3	3–0	0–3	0–3	1–3	0–3
Olympiacos	3–0	2–3	3–0	3–1	3–0	3–0		3–0	3–0	3–0	3–1	3–0
Orestiada	0–3	0–3	0–3	1–3	0–3	3–1	0–3		1–3	3–1	0–3	0–3
Pamvohaikos	3–0	3–2	3–1	3–2	0–3	3–0	1–3	3–0		0–3	3–2	2–3
Panachaiki	3–2	2–3	2–3	1–3	3–1	2–3	0–3	3–2	1–3		1–3	0–3
Panathinaikos	3–1	3–2	3–0	3–0	3–1	3–0	1–3	3–1	3–0	3–0		3–2
PAOK	3–0	3–1	3–0	3–0	3–0	3–0	2–3	3–0	3–0	3–1	1–3	

Updated to match(es) played on 30 April 2017. Source:
Legend: Blue = home team win; Red = away team win.

== Play-out (9–11) ==
- 1st/4th fixture Panachaiki vs Iraklis Chalkidas 2-3/0-3
- 2nd/5th fixture Iraklis Chalkidas vs Kyzikos Nea Peramos 3-2/0-3
- 3rd/6th fixture Kyzikos Nea Peramos vs Panachaiki 2-3/1-3
- Score table: Iraklis Chalkidas 7, Panachaiki 6, Kyzikos Nea Peramos 5.

Source: Volleyleague.gr Play-out 9–12 Archived 2017-04-11 at the Wayback Machine

== Play-off (1–8) ==
The eight teams that finished in the places 1 to 8 in the Regular season, compete in the Play-off (1–8).

Quarter-finals
1	Olympiacos	2
8	Iraklis	0
4	Pamvohaikos	2
5	Kifisia	0
2	PAOK Thessaloniki	2
7	Ethnikos Alexandroupoli	0
3	Panathinaikos	2
6	Foinikas Syros	1

Semi-finals
Olympiacos	3
Pamvohaikos	0
PAOK Thessaloniki	3
Panathinaikos	0

Final
Olympiacos	2
PAOK Thessaloniki	3

== Final standings ==
Qualified for the 2017–18 CEV Champions League
Qualified for the 2017–18 Men's CEV Cup
Qualified for the 2017–18 CEV Challenge Cup
Relegated to the 2017–18 A2 Ethniki

Rank	Team
1st place, gold medalist(s)	PAOK Thessaloniki
2nd place, silver medalist(s)	Olympiacos Piraeus
3rd place, bronze medalist(s)	Panathinaikos Athens
4	Pamvohaikos Vocha
5	Kifissia
6	Foinikas Syros
7	Ethnikos Alexandroupolis
8	Iraklis Thessaloniki
9	Iraklis Chalkidas
10	Panachaiki
11	Kyzikos Nea Peramos
12	Orestiada
