= Ioannis Takouridis =

Greek volleyball player (born 1988)

Personal information
- Nationality: Greek
- Born: 24 May 1988 (age 38)
- Height: 195 cm (6 ft 5 in)
- Weight: 80 kg (176 lb)
- Spike: 300 cm (118 in)
- Block: 290 cm (114 in)

Volleyball information
- Position: Middle Blocker
- Current club: PAOK
- Number: 13

Career
Years	Teams
2006–2011	Aris
2011–2012	Iraklis
2012–2014	Foinikas Syros
2014–2015	Olympiacos
2015	Panachaiki
2015–	PAOK

National team
2010–2019	Greece
Honours
Men's volleyball
Representing Greece
Mediterranean Games
Bronze medal – third place	2018 Tarragona	Team

Ioannis Takouridis (Greek: Γιάννης Τακουρίδης; born 24 May 1988) is a Greek professional volleyball player, member of the Greece men's national volleyball team. On club level he plays for PAOK.
