= 2013–14 CEV Cup =

- League: CEV Cup
- Sport: Volleyball
- Duration: 18 October 2013 – 29 March 2014

Finals
- Champions: (France) Paris Volley
- Runners-up: (Russia) Guberniya Nizhniy Novgorod
- Finals MVP: (Serbia) Marko Ivović (PAR)

CEV Cup seasons
- ← 2012–13 2014–15 →

The 2013–14 CEV Cup was the 42nd edition of the European CEV Cup volleyball club tournament.

French club Paris Volley beat Russian Guberniya Nizhniy Novgorod after winning second match and Golden Set. Serbian outside hitter Marko Ivovic was honored as the Most Valuable Player of the final tournament.

== Participating teams ==
Country	Number of teams	Teams
Austria	2	Amstetten Hypo Nö, Aon hotVolleys Vienna
Belgium	2	Prefaxis Menen, Precura Antwerpen
Bulgaria	1	CVC Gabrovo
Croatia	2	OK Mladost Marina Kaštela, MOK Mursa Osijek
Czech Republic	2	VK Dukla Liberec, Volejbal Brno
Estonia	1	VK Selver Tallinn
Finland	1	Tiikerit Kokkola
France	2 +1	Arago de Sète, Nantes Rezé Métropole, Paris Volley
Germany	2 +1	TV Ingersoll Bühl, Generali Unterhaching, VfB Friedrichshafen
Greece	2 +1	PAOK Thessaloniki, Ethnikos Alexandroupolis, Olympiacos Piraeus
Italy	1	Bre Banca Lannutti Cuneo
Netherlands	2	FirmX Orion Doetinchem, Landstede Zwolle
Poland	1	PGE Skra Bełchatów
Romania	2 +1	SCM U Craiova, Volei Municipal Zalău, Tomis Constanța
Russia	1	Guberniya Nizhniy Novgorod
Spain	1	CAI Teruel
Serbia	2	MOK Djerdap Kladovo, Radnicki Kragujevac
Slovakia	1	VKP Bratislava
Switzerland	1	Volley Amriswil
Turkey	1	Maliye Milli Piyango Ankara
Ukraine	2	Crimsoda Krasnoperekopsk, Lokomotiv Kharkiv

== Main phase ==
=== 16th Finals ===
Team 1	Agg.	Team 2	1st leg	2nd leg	Golden Set
Nantes Rezé Métropole (France)	1–6	(Italy) Bre Banca Lannutti Cuneo	1–3	0–3	
TV Ingersoll Bühl (Germany)	5–4	(Netherlands) Landstede Zwolle	3–1	2–3	
Amstetten Hypo Nö (Austria)	3–5	(Serbia) Radnicki Kragujevac	3–2	0–3	
PAOK Thessaloniki (Greece)	6–1	(Croatia) OK Mladost Marina Kaštela	3–0	3–1	
Maliye Milli Piyango Ankara (Turkey)	5–5	(Ukraine) Lokomotiv Kharkiv	2–3	3–2	15–12
Tiikerit Kokkola (Finland)	5–5	(Serbia) MOK Djerdap Kladovo	3–2	2–3	8–15
VKP Bratislava (Slovakia)	0–6	(Bulgaria) CVC Gabrovo	0–3	0–3	
Prefaxis Menen (Belgium)	6–3	(Austria) Aon hotVolleys Vienna	3–2	3–1	
Volei Municipal Zalău (Romania)	1–6	(Russia) Guberniya Nizhniy Novgorod	0–3	1–3	
VK Selver Tallinn (Estonia)	0–6	(Czech Republic) VK Dukla Liberec	0–3	0–3	
SCM U Craiova (Romania)	6–0	(Netherlands) FirmX Orion Doetinchem	3–0	3–0	
Arago de Sète (France)	6–0	(Croatia) MOK Mursa Osijek	3–0	3–0	
Generali Unterhaching (Germany)	6–2	(Belgium) Precura Antwerpen	3–2	3–0	
CAI Teruel (Spain)	6–2	(Ukraine) Crimsoda Krasnoperekopsk	3–0	3–2	
Volley Amriswil (Switzerland)	3–3	(Czech Republic) Volejbal Brno	3–0	0–3	17–15
PGE Skra Bełchatów (Poland)	6–1	(Greece) Ethnikos Alexandroupolis	3–1	3–0	

=== 8th Finals ===
Team 1	Agg.	Team 2	1st leg	2nd leg	Golden Set
TV Ingersoll Bühl (Germany)	5–5	(Italy) Bre Banca Lannutti Cuneo	2–3	3–2	15–12
Radnicki Kragujevac (Serbia)	3–6	(Greece) PAOK Thessaloniki	2–3	1–3	
MOK Djerdap Kladovo (Serbia)	1–6	(Turkey) Maliye Milli Piyango Ankara	1–3	0–3	
Prefaxis Menen (Belgium)	5–5	(Bulgaria) CVC Gabrovo	3–2	2–3	14–16
Guberniya Nizhniy Novgorod (Russia)	6–0	(Czech Republic) VK Dukla Liberec	3–0	3–0	
Arago de Sète (France)	6–3	(Romania) SCM U Craiova	3–1	3–2	
Generali Unterhaching (Germany)	4–3	(Spain) CAI Teruel	3–0	1–3	15–11
PGE Skra Bełchatów (Poland)	6–0	(Switzerland) Volley Amriswil	3–0	3–0	

=== 4th Finals ===
Team 1	Agg.	Team 2	1st leg	2nd leg
TV Ingersoll Bühl (Germany)	6–2	(Greece) PAOK Thessaloniki	3–0	3–2
CVC Gabrovo (Bulgaria)	4–5	(Turkey) Maliye Milli Piyango Ankara	3–2	1–3
Arago de Sète (France)	1–6	(Russia) Guberniya Nizhniy Novgorod	0–3	1–3
Generali Unterhaching (Germany)	2–6	(Poland) PGE Skra Bełchatów	0–3	2–3

==== First leg ====
Date	Time		Score		Set 1	Set 2	Set 3	Set 4	Set 5	Total	Report
15 Jan	20:00	TV Ingersoll Bühl (Germany)	3–0	(Greece) PAOK Thessaloniki	25–19	25–16	25–23			75–58	Report
15 Jan	18:00	CVC Gabrovo (Bulgaria)	3–2	(Turkey) Maliye Milli Piyango Ankara	25–23	14–25	25–23	23–25	15–13	102–109	Report
14 Jan	20:00	Arago de Sète (France)	0–3	(Russia) Guberniya Nizhniy Novgorod	23–25	22–25	12–25			57–75	Report
16 Jan	20:00	Generali Unterhaching (Germany)	0–3	(Poland) PGE Skra Bełchatów	27–29	29–31	17–25			73–85	Report

==== Second leg ====
Date	Time		Score		Set 1	Set 2	Set 3	Set 4	Set 5	Total	Report
22 Jan	19:00	PAOK Thessaloniki (Greece)	2–3	(Germany) TV Ingersoll Bühl	21–25	25–22	22–25	28–26	12–15	108–113	Report
22 Jan	18:00	Maliye Milli Piyango Ankara (Turkey)	3–1	(Bulgaria) CVC Gabrovo	25–11	21–25	27–25	25–19		98–80	Report
23 Jan	19:00	Guberniya Nizhniy Novgorod (Russia)	3–1	(France) Arago de Sète	19–25	25–21	25–20	25–17		94–83	Report
23 Jan	18:00	PGE Skra Bełchatów (Poland)	3–2	(Germany) Generali Unterhaching	25–21	25–19	22–25	22–25	28–26	122–116	Report

== Challenge phase ==
Team 1	Agg.	Team 2	1st leg	2nd leg	Golden Set
Paris Volley (France)	6–1	(Germany) TV Ingersoll Bühl	3–0	3–1	
Maliye Milli Piyango Ankara (Turkey)	1–6	(Romania) Tomis Constanța	1–3	0–3	
Guberniya Nizhniy Novgorod (Russia)	4–3	(Greece) Olympiacos Piraeus	3–0	1–3	15–8
VfB Friedrichshafen (Germany)	3–6	(Poland) PGE Skra Bełchatów	1–3	2–3	

=== First leg ===
Date	Time		Score		Set 1	Set 2	Set 3	Set 4	Set 5	Total	Report
4 Feb	20:00	Paris Volley (France)	3–0	(Germany) TV Ingersoll Bühl	25–23	25–14	25–22			75–59	Report
5 Feb	17:30	Maliye Milli Piyango Ankara (Turkey)	1–3	(Romania) Tomis Constanța	16–25	25–18	24–26	19–25		84–94	Report
5 Feb	19:00	Guberniya Nizhniy Novgorod (Russia)	3–0	(Greece) Olympiacos Piraeus	25–19	25–22	25–21			75–62	Report
5 Feb	20:00	VfB Friedrichshafen (Germany)	2–3	(Poland) PGE Skra Bełchatów	25–17	21–25	25–17	18–25	10–15	99–99	Report

=== Second leg ===
Date	Time		Score		Set 1	Set 2	Set 3	Set 4	Set 5	Total	Report
12 Feb	20:00	TV Ingersoll Bühl (Germany)	1–3	(France) Paris Volley	14–25	26–28	25–21	19–25		84–99	Report
13 Feb	18:00	Tomis Constanța (Romania)	3–0	(Turkey) Maliye Milli Piyango Ankara	25–23	25–21	29–27			79–71	Report
12 Feb	17:00	Olympiacos Piraeus (Greece)	3–1	(Russia) Guberniya Nizhniy Novgorod	18–25	25–21	25–21	25–22		93–89	Report
Golden set		Olympiacos Piraeus (Greece)	8–15	(Russia) Guberniya Nizhniy Novgorod							
13 Feb	18:00	PGE Skra Bełchatów (Poland)	3–1	(Germany) VfB Friedrichshafen	24–26	26–24	25–17	25–23		100–90	Report

== Final phase ==
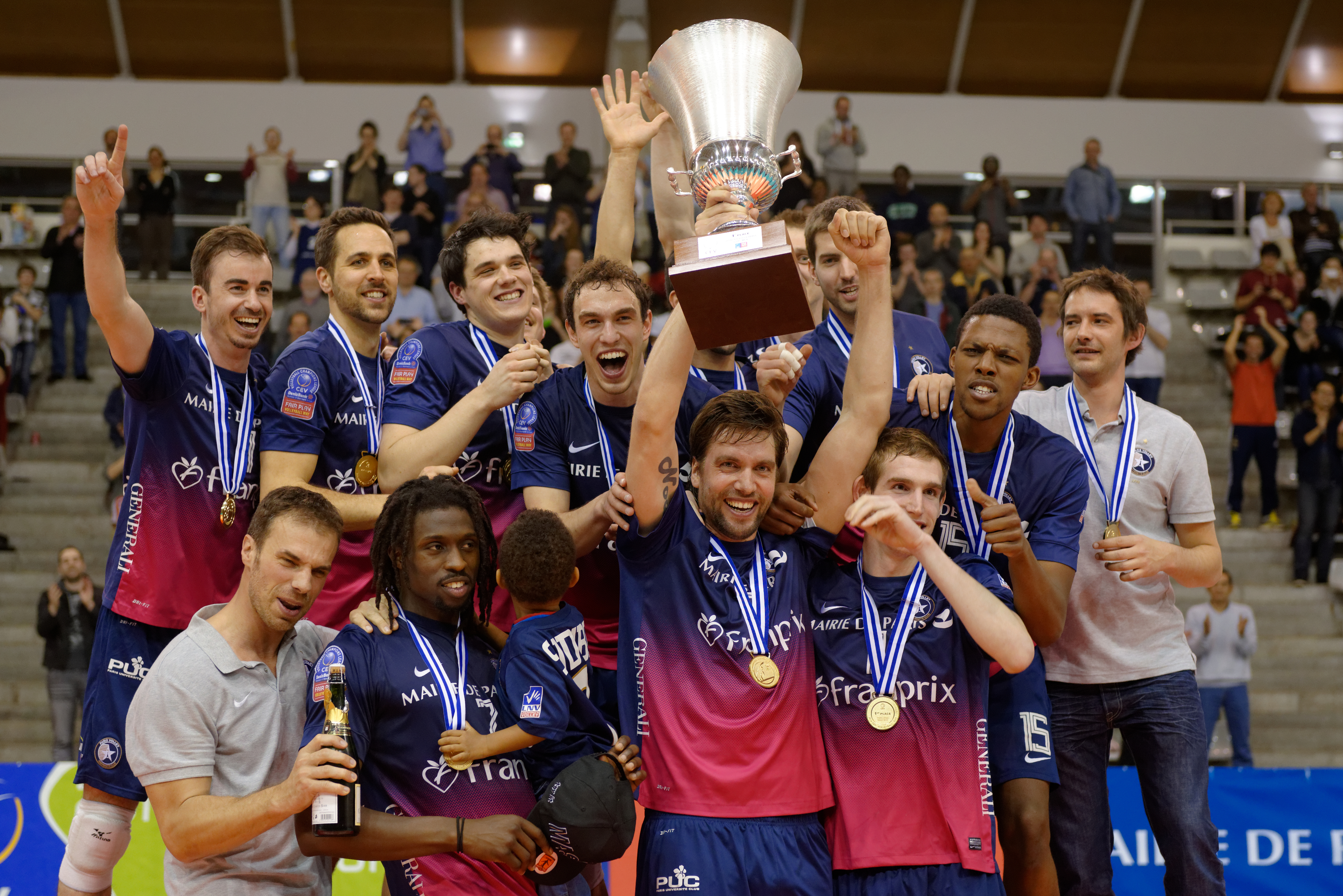
Paris Volley celebrate their victory in the finale on 29 March 2014.

=== Semi finals ===
Team 1	Agg.	Team 2	1st leg	2nd leg	Golden Set
Paris Volley (France)	5–5	(Romania) Tomis Constanța	2–3	3–2	15–12
Guberniya Nizhniy Novgorod (Russia)	6–4	(Poland) PGE Skra Bełchatów	3–2	3–2	

==== First leg ====
Date	Time		Score		Set 1	Set 2	Set 3	Set 4	Set 5	Total	Report
25 Feb	20:00	Paris Volley (France)	2–3	(Romania) Tomis Constanța	25–23	25–20	23–25	13–25	9–15	95–108	Report
26 Feb	19:45	Guberniya Nizhniy Novgorod (Russia)	3–2	(Poland) PGE Skra Bełchatów	25–19	25–21	22–25	22–25	15–13	109–103	Report

==== Second leg ====
Date	Time		Score		Set 1	Set 2	Set 3	Set 4	Set 5	Total	Report
2 Mar	18:00	Tomis Constanța (Romania)	2–3	(France) Paris Volley	25–12	20–25	25–20	23–25	11–15	104–97	Report
Golden set		Tomis Constanța (Romania)	12–15	(France) Paris Volley							
2 Mar	20:00	PGE Skra Bełchatów (Poland)	2–3	(Russia) Guberniya Nizhniy Novgorod	25–21	19–25	23–25	25–18	14–16	106–105	Report

=== Final ===
==== First leg ====
Date	Time		Score		Set 1	Set 2	Set 3	Set 4	Set 5	Total	Report
26 Mar	19:00	Guberniya Nizhniy Novgorod (Russia)	3–0	(France) Paris Volley	25–15	25–18	25–21			75–54	Report

==== Second leg ====
Date	Time		Score		Set 1	Set 2	Set 3	Set 4	Set 5	Total	Report
29 Mar	20:00	Paris Volley (France)	3–1	(Russia) Guberniya Nizhniy Novgorod	25–23	23–25	25–21	25–19		98–88	Report
Golden set		Paris Volley (France)	15–11	(Russia) Guberniya Nizhniy Novgorod							

== Final standing ==
Rank	Team
1st place, gold medalist(s)	(France) Paris Volley
2nd place, silver medalist(s)	(Russia) Guberniya Nizhniy Novgorod
Semifinalists	(Romania) Tomis Constanța
Semifinalists	(Poland) PGE Skra Bełchatów

2014 CEV Cup winner
(France)
Paris Volley
2nd title

Guillermo Hernán, Mory Sidibé, Jeroen Trommel, Antoine Brizard, Denis Van der Veen, Marko Ivović, William Bersani da Costa, Philippe Tuitoga, Markus Steuerwald, Kevin Kaba, Remi Fidon, Ardo Kreek
Head coach
Dorian Rougeyron
