= Mitar Tzourits =

Serbian-Greek volleyball player (born 1989)

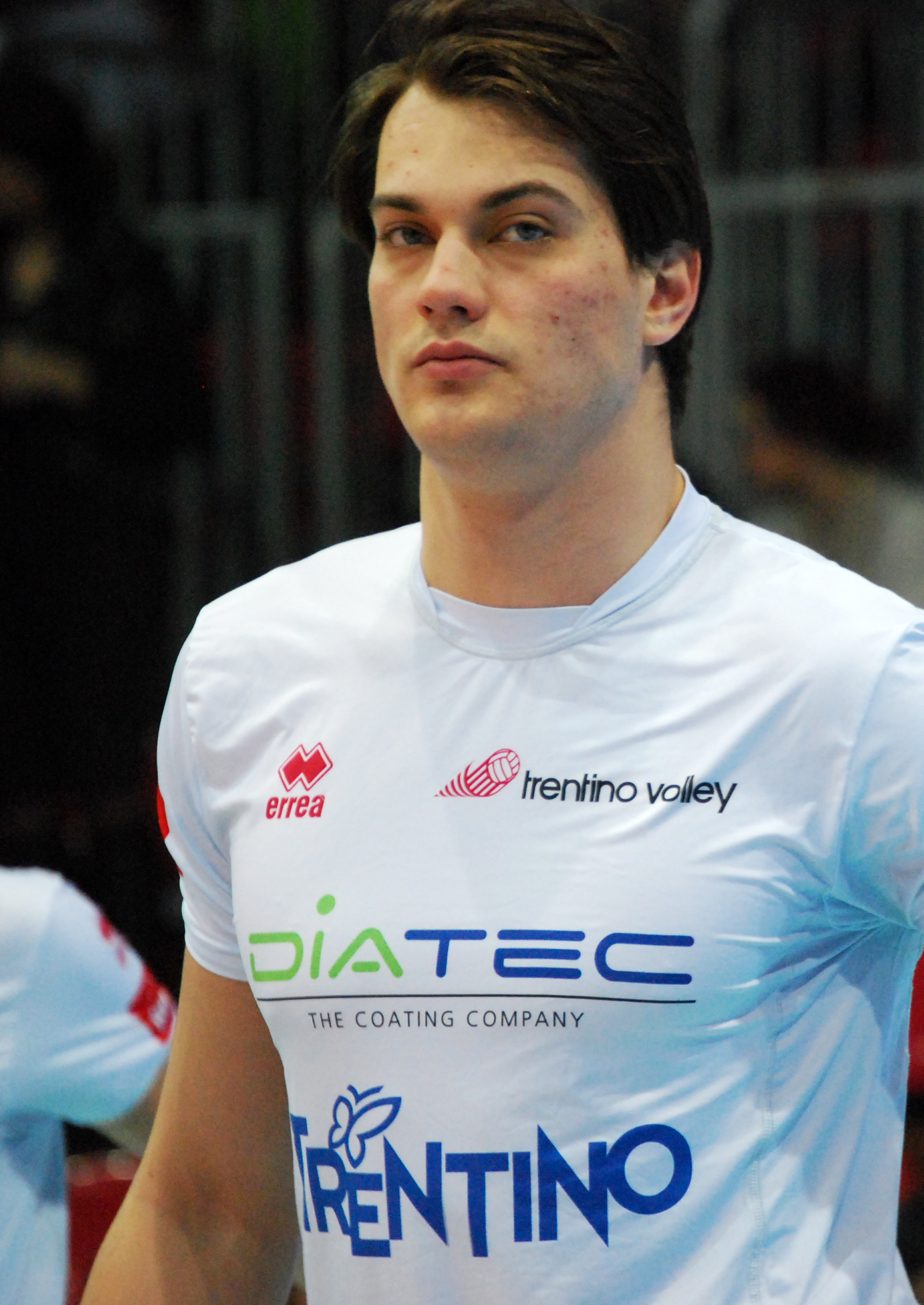

Personal information
- Full name: Mitar Đurić
- Nationality: Greek
- Born: 25 April 1989 (age 37); Sarajevo, SR Bosnia and Herzegovina
- Height: 211 cm (6 ft 11 in)
- Weight: 115 kg (254 lb)
- Spike: 365 cm (144 in)
- Block: 340 cm (134 in)

Volleyball information
- Position: Outside hitter
- Current club: Olympiacos SF Piraus

Career
Years	Teams
2006–2011; 2011–2013; 2013–2014; 2014; 2014–2016; 2016–2018; 2018–2019; 2019; 2019–2020; 2020–2021; 2021–2023; 2023–	(Greece) Olympiacos Piraeus (Italy) Trentino Volley (Turkey) Halkbank Ankara (South Korea) Suwon KEPCO Vixtorm (Italy) Trentino Volley (Italy) Calzedonia Verona (Greece) PAOK Thessaloniki (France) Stade Poitevin Poitiers (Italy) Trentino Volley (Slovenia) ACH Volley Ljubljana (Greece) Foinikas Syros (Greece) Olympiacos Piraeus

National team
2009–2019	Greece (126)
- Last updated: 8 April 2026

Mitar Djuric (Greek: Δημήτρης Τζούριτς, Serbian Cyrillic: Митар Дурић; born 25 April 1989) or Dimitris Tzourits is a Serbian-Greek male volleyball player. He competed at the 2011 FIVB Volleyball Men's Club World Championship with Trentino Volley.

== Sporting achievements ==
=== Clubs ===
FIVB Volleyball Men's Club World Championship

- 2011, 2012 - with Trentino Diatec

MEVZA League

- 2021 - with ACH Volley Ljubljana

CEV Champions League

- 2011/2012 - with Trentino Volley
- 2013/2014 - with Halkbank Ankara
- 2015/2016 - with Trentino Volley

National championships

- 2008/2009 Hellenic Championship, with Olympiacos Piraeus
- 2009/2010 Hellenic Championship, with Olympiacos Piraeus
- 2010/2011 Hellenic Championship, with Olympiacos Piraeus
- 2011/2012 Italian Championship, with Trentino Volley
- 2012/2013 Italian Championship, with Trentino Volley
- 2013/2014 Turkish Championship, with Halkbank Ankara
- 2014/2015 Italian Championship, with Trentino Volley
- 2023/2024 Hellenic Championship, with Olympiacos Piraeus
- 2024/2025 Hellenic Championship, with Olympiacos Piraeus

National cups

- 2008/2009 Hellenic Cup, with Olympiacos Piraeus
- 2010 Hellenic Super Cup, with Olympiacos Piraeus
- 2010/2011 Hellenic Cup, with Olympiacos Piraeus
- 2011 Italian Super Cup, with Trentino Volley
- 2011/2012 Italian Cup, with Trentino Volley
- 2012/2013 Italian Cup, with Trentino Volley
- 2013 Turkish Super Cup, with Halkbank Ankara
- 2013/2014 Turkish Cup, with Halkbank Ankara
- 2021 Hellenic Super Cup, with Foinikas Syros
- 2023/2024 Hellenic Cup - with Olympiacos Piraeus
- 2024 Hellenic Super Cup, with Olympiacos Piraeus
- 2024/2025 Hellenic League Cup, with Olympiacos Piraeus
- 2024/2025 Hellenic Cup, with Olympiacos Piraeus
- 2025/2026 Hellenic League Cup, with Olympiacos Piraeus
- 2025 Hellenic Super Cup

=== National team ===
- 2014 European League

=== Individual awards ===
- 2009: Hellenic Championship – MVP
- 2010: Hellenic Championship – Best blocker (99 block points)
- 2010: Hellenic Super Cup - MVP
- 2011: Hellenic Championship – Best scorer (538 points)
- 2011: Hellenic Championship – Best opposite
- 2014: European League – Best scorer (235 points) – Best server (18 aces)
- 2016: Italian Cup – Best scorer
- 2021: Hellenic Super Cup - MVP
- 2024: Hellenic Cup - MVP
- 2024: Hellenic Championship – MVP
- 2025 Hellenic League Cup – MVP
