= Theoklitos Karipidis =

Greek volleyball player (born 1980)

Personal information
- Nationality: Greek
- Born: 18 January 1980 (age 46)
- Height: 202 cm (6 ft 8 in)

Volleyball information

Career
- Years: Team
- 1997–2003: (Greece) Iraklis Thessaloniki
- 2003–2004: (Italy) Sisley Treviso
- 2004–2005: (Italy) Dorica Ancona
- 2005: (Italy) Lanza Verona
- 2005–2006: (Italy) Fiorese Bassano
- 2006–2007: (Greece) PAOK Thessaloniki
- 2007–2009: (Greece) Olympiacos Piraeus
- 2009–2011: (Greece) AEK Athens
- 2011–2013: (Greece) Kifissia
- 2013–2014: (Greece) Panathinaikos

National team
- Years: Team
- –: Greece

Theoklitos Karipidis (born 18 January 1980) is a Greek former volleyball player. He played for the Greece men's national volleyball team, representing his country, among other events, at the 2009 Men's European Volleyball Championship.
