= Konstantinos Prousalis =

Greek coach and former volleyball player

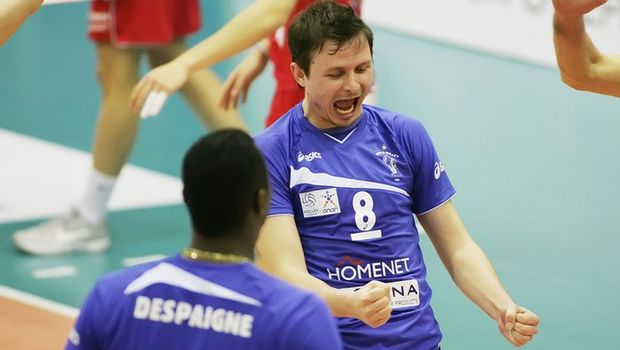

Personal information
- Full name: Konstantinos Prousalis
- Nationality: Greek
- Born: 6 October 1980 (age 46); Naousa, Imathia, Greece
- Height: 1.92 m (6 ft 4 in)
- Weight: 77 kg (170 lb)
- Spike: 320 cm (130 in)
- Block: 295 cm (116 in)

Coaching information
Previous teams coached
Years	Teams
2024–2025; 2025	(Greece) Iraklis Thessaloniki U21 (Greece) Iraklis Thessaloniki

Volleyball information
- Position: Setter

Career
Years	Teams
1998–2004; 2004–2006; 2006–2007; 2007–2008; 2008–2009; 2009–2012; 2012–2014; 2014–2015; 2015–2017; 2017–2020; 2020–2021; 2021–2022; 2022–2023; 2023–2024; 2024–2025	(Greece) P.A.O.K. (Greece) E.A. Patras (Greece) Panathinaikos (Greece) Aris Thessaloniki (Greece) P.A.O.K. (Greece) Iraklis Thessaloniki (France) Narbonne Volley (Greece) Olympiacos (France) Narbonne Volley (Greece) Iraklis Thessaloniki (Greece) Filippos Veria (Greece) Olympiacos (Greece) Aristotelis Skydra (Greece) Pegasus Polichni (Greece) Iraklis Thessaloniki

National team
Greece
- Last updated: October 10, 2026

Konstantinos Prousalis (Greek: Κωνσταντίνος Προύσαλης; born 6 October 1980) is a Greek coach and former volleyball player. He played for the Greece men's national volleyball team. He was part of the national team at the 2004 Summer Olympics in Athens, Greece.
