= Alexander Shafranovich =

Israeli volleyball player (born 1984)

Alexander Shafranovich 'אלכס שפרנוביץ

Personal information
- Nationality: Ukraine, Israel
- Born: 2 April 1983 (age 43); Pryluky, Ukrainian SSR, Soviet Union
- Height: 194 cm (6 ft 4 in)
- Weight: 89 kg (196 lb)
- Spike: 342 cm (135 in)
- Block: 334 cm (131 in)

Volleyball information
- Position: Opposite hitter

Career
Years	Teams
2001–2003; 2003–2004; 2004–2005; 2005–2006; 2006–2007; 2007–2008; 2008–2010; 2010–2011; 2011; 2011–2013; 2013–2014; 2014–2015; 2015–2016; 2016–2019; 2019–2021; 2021–2022; 2022–2023	(Israel) Mac. Hod HaScharon (Israel) Hapoel Hazor (Germany) VfB Friedrichshafen (Greece) E.A. Patras (Ukraine) Azovstal Mariupol (France) Beauvais Oise UC (France) Montpellier Hérault (Montenegro) OK Budvanska Rivijera (Italy) CheBanca Mailand (Germany) TSV Unterhaching (France) Nantes-Rezé MV (Greece) PAOK (Poland) Jastrzębski Węgiel (Greece) PAOK (Czech Republic) VK Dukla Liberec (Israel) Hapoel Yoav Kfar Saba (Israel) Hapoel Mate-Asher

National team
2001–2021	Israel

Alexander Shafranovich (Hebrew: אלכס שפרנוביץ'; born 2 April 1983) is an Israeli volleyball retired player and current coach. He was member of the Israel men's national volleyball team for 20 years. He was one of the key players that contributed to 2 Greek Championships and 3 Cups for PAOK.

== Sporting achievements ==
- 2004–2005 German Championship, with VfB Friedrichshafen
- 2004–2005 German Cup, with VfB Friedrichshafen
- 2007–2008 French Cup, with Beauvais Oise UC
- 2010–2011 Montenegrin Championship, with OK Budvanska Rivijera
- 2010–2011 Montenegrin Cup, with OK Budvanska Rivijera
- 2012–2013 German Cup, with TSV Unterhaching
- 2014–2015 Greek Championship, with PAOK
- 2014–2015 Greek Cup, with PAOK
- 2016–2017 Greek Championship, with PAOK
- 2017–2018 Greek Cup, with PAOK
- 2018–2019 Greek Cup, with PAOK

=== Individual ===
- 2016–2017 Greek Championship MVP
