= Philippe Tuitoga =

French volleyball player (born 1990)

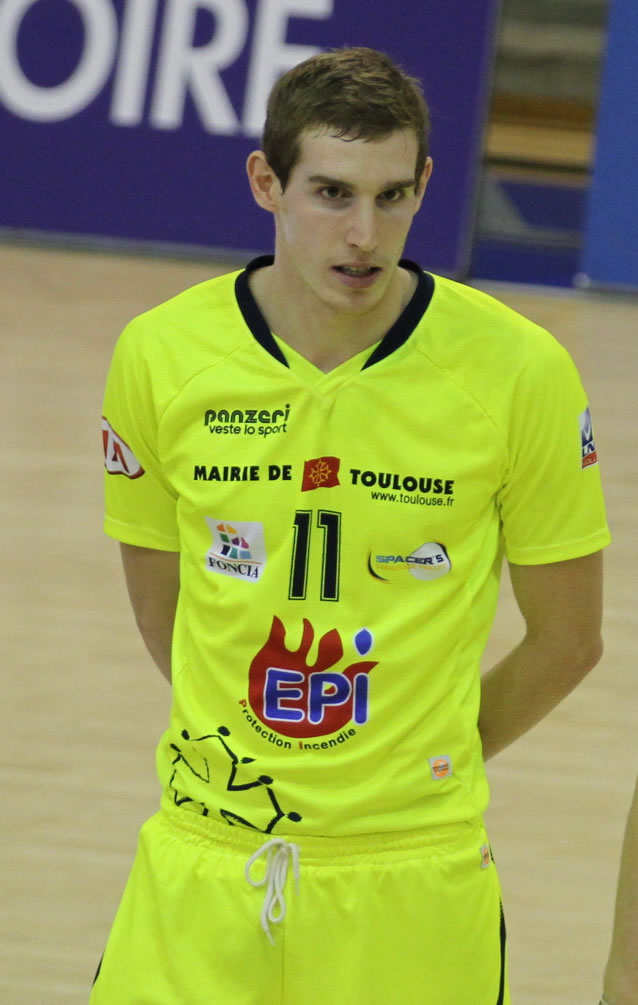

Personal information
- Nickname: Pipo
- Nationality: French
- Born: 18 December 1990 (age 35); Vitry-sur-Seine, France
- Height: 2.02 m (6 ft 8 in)
- Weight: 87 kg (192 lb)
- Spike: 352 cm (139 in)
- Block: 335 cm (132 in)

Volleyball information
- Position: Middle blocker
- Current club: Nantes Rezé Métropole

Career
| Years | Teams |
|---|---|
| 2012–2014; 2014–2016; 2016–2017; 2017– | Paris Volley; Spacer's de Toulouse; Nice Volley-Ball; Nantes Rezé Métropole |
- Last updated: 1 January 2018

Philippe Tuitoga (born 18 December 1990) is a French male volleyball player. He is part of the France men's national volleyball team. On club level he plays for TOAC TUC.
