= P.A.O.K. V.C. =

Greek volleyball club

PAOK
- Nickname: Double-Headed Eagle of the North; Patriarch
- Founded: 1926 (Volleyball Club: 1933)
- Ground: PAOK Sports Arena (Capacity: 8,142)
- Chairman: Alkiviadis Isaiadis
- Manager: Chrysovalantis Mamais
- Captain: Ioannis Takouridis
- League: A1 Volleyleague
- 2024–25: 4th
- Website: Club home page
- Championships: 3 Greek Championships; 5 Greek Cups; 1 Greek Super Cup

Uniforms
Home	Away

PAOK Volleyball Club or PAOK Volley, is a Greek volleyball club based in Thessaloniki and part of the major multi-sport club PAOK. The department was founded in 1933 and refounded in 1948 after the Axis occupation. Their home ground is PAOK Sports Arena. PAOK have won 9 domestic titles in total with 3 Championships (2015, 2016, 2017), 5 Cups (2015, 2018, 2019, 2022, 2023) and 1 Super Cup (2023).

PAOK made their first appearance in the top national division in the 1970–71 season. The team won its first trophies claiming the Double in 2015 and debuted in the CEV Champions League the following season. In 2015–16 season, PAOK became the first team in Greek Volleyball history that won the Greek Championship title despite finishing 4th in the regular season.

PAOK Sports Arena

== Current squad ==
Season 2025–26

Shirt No	Nationality	Player	Birth Date	Height	Position
2	Serbia	Uroš Kovačević	May 6, 1993 (age 33)	1.98	Outside Hitter
4	Greece	Iasonas Telios	April 22, 2009 (age 17)	1.82	Libero
6	Greece	Giorgos Michelakis	May 27, 1997 (age 29)	1.77	Libero
9	Greece	Menelaos Kokkinakis	January 21, 1993 (age 33)	1.93	Outside Hitter
11	Cuba	Alberto Lázaro Torres	September 11, 1996 (age 30)	1.98	Outside Hitter
12	Bulgaria	Nikolay Kolev	December 16, 1997 (age 28)	2.05	Middle Blocker
13	Greece	Ioannis Takouridis (c)	May 24, 1988 (age 38)	1.98	Middle Blocker
14	Greece	Markos Galiotos	August 23, 1996 (age 30)	1.95	Setter
15	Greece	Vasilis Karassavidis	March 17, 1995 (age 31)	1.98	Libero
18	Greece	Nikos Bonias	February 14, 2008 (age 18)	2.02	Middle Blocker
19	Cuba	Fernando Hernández	October 11, 1989 (age 37)	1.96	Opposite Hitter
24	United States	Jeffrey Jendryk	September 15, 1995 (age 31)	2.08	Middle Blocker
27	Greece	Stavros Mouchlias	January 5, 2008 (age 18)	2.05	Outside Hitter
99	Greece	Lazaros Pavlidis	July 11, 2006 (age 20)	2.00	Setter

=== Board of directors ===
Board of directors
President	(Greece) Alkiviadis Isaiadis
Vice chairman & technical manager	(Greece) Κonstantinos Paisiadis
Head of administrative and legal affairs	(Greece) Katerina Giannakopoulou
Security officer and manager in upcoming sporting authorities	(Greece) Achilleas Tzikas
Contact person with the links	(Greece) Antonia Manola
Head of marketing	(Greece) Stelios Beleveslis
Head of press and communications	(Greece) Georgios Pikoulas

=== Technical staff ===
Technical staff
Head coach	(Greece) Chrisovalantis Mamais
Assistant coach	Vacant
Team manager	(Greece) Kostas Avgitidis
Τrainer	(Greece) Giorgos Ioannidis
Head physiotherapist	(Greece) Dimitris Pagotos
Statistician	(Greece) Panagiotis Kountouridis
Statistician	(Greece) Vasiliki Nenti
Pathologist	(Greece) Makis Lefkaditis
Orthopedic doctor	(Greece) Dionysis Nikiforos
Scoutman	(Greece) Stefanos Maniotis
Carer	(Greece) Kosmas Kazias

== Honours ==
=== Domestic ===
- Greek Championship
  - Winners (3): 2014–15, 2015–16, 2016–17
- Greek Cup
  - Winners (5): 2014–15, 2017–18, 2018–19, 2021–22, 2022–23
- Greek Super Cup
  - Winners (1): 2023
- Double
  - Winners (1): 2014−15

== Historical performance in Volleyleague and Greek Cup ==
Season	Division	Place	Greek Cup
1993–94	A1 Ethniki	7th	
1994–95	A1 Ethniki	8th	Not held
1995–96	A1 Ethniki	10th	Not held
1996–97	A1 Ethniki	10th	
1997–98	A1 Ethniki	9th	
1998–99	A1 Ethniki	4th	Semi-finals
1999–00	A1 Ethniki	4th	Quarter-finals
2000–01	A1 Ethniki	6th	Quarter-finals
2001–02	A1 Ethniki	5th	Quarter-finals
2002–03	A1 Ethniki	5th	Semi-finals
2003–04	A1 Ethniki	4th	Semi-finals
2004–05	A1 Ethniki	4th	Quarter-finals
2005–06	A1 Ethniki	4th	Quarter-finals
2006–07	A1 Ethniki	4th	Quarter-finals
2007–08	A1 Ethniki	10th	Quarter-finals
2008–09	A1 Ethniki	8th	—
2009–10	A1 Ethniki	6th	Quarter-finals

Season	Division	Place	Greek Cup
2010–11	A1 Ethniki	4th	Semi-finals
2011–12	A1 Ethniki	7th	Quarter-finals
2012–13	A1 Ethniki	3rd	Quarter-finals
2013–14	A1 Ethniki	6th	Semi-finals
2014–15	A1 Ethniki	1st	Winner
2015–16	A1 Ethniki	1st	Semi-finals
2016–17	A1 Ethniki	1st	Semi-finals
2017–18	A1 Ethniki	2nd	Winner
2018–19	A1 Ethniki	2nd	Winner
2019–20	A1 Ethniki	3rd	Abandoned *
2020–21	A1 Ethniki	4th	Cancelled *
2021–22	A1 Ethniki	4th	Winner
2022–23	A1 Ethniki	2nd	Winner
2023–24	A1 Ethniki	4th	Semi-finals
2024–25	A1 Ethniki	4th	Runner-up
2025–26	A1 Ethniki	2nd	Quarter-finals

- The 2019–20 Cup was abandoned due to COVID-19 while PAOK was in the semi-finals. The 2020–21 Cup was not held for the same reasons.

=== Positions in Volleyleague ===
Position	1st	2nd	3rd	4th	5th
Times	3	4	2	11	2

=== Greek Cup Finals ===
Year	Winner	Finalist	Score
1983	Olympiacos	PAOK	3–1
2015	PAOK	Olympiacos	3–1
2018	PAOK	Iraklis	3–0
2019	PAOK	Iraklis	3–1
2022	PAOK	Foinikas Syros	3–0
2023	PAOK	Olympiacos	3–1
2025	Olympiacos	PAOK	3–1
Total	5	2	

== European record ==
Season	Competition	Round	Club	Home	Away	Aggregate	Qual.
2000–01	CEV Challenge Cup	QR	(Switzerland) Lausanne UC	3–1		2nd place	
2000–01	CEV Challenge Cup	QR	(Estonia) Pärnu VK	1–3		2nd place	
2000–01	CEV Challenge Cup	QR	(Luxembourg) VC Mamer	3–1		2nd place	
2003–04	CEV Challenge Cup	QR	(Romania) Dinamo București	3–0		1st place	
2003–04	CEV Challenge Cup	QR	(Slovenia) OK Maribor	3–0		1st place	
2003–04	CEV Challenge Cup	QR	(Croatia) Mladost Zagreb	3–2		1st place	
2003–04	CEV Challenge Cup	1/16	(France) Stade Poitevin Poitiers	3–2	2–3	5–5	
2004–05	CEV Challenge Cup	1/8	(Russia) Iskra Odintsovo	2–3	1–3	3–6	
2005–06	CEV Challenge Cup	QR	(Serbia) Crvena Zvezda	3–1		1st place	
2005–06	CEV Challenge Cup	QR	(Azerbaijan) Azerneft Baku	3–0		1st place	
2005–06	CEV Challenge Cup	QR	(Switzerland) Chênois Genève	3–2		1st place	
2005–06	CEV Challenge Cup	1/8	(Italy) Padova	3–0*	1–3	4–3	
2006–07	CEV Cup	QR	(Belarus) Shakhtospetsstroi Soligorsk	3–0		1st place	
2006–07	CEV Cup	QR	(Azerbaijan) Azerneft Baku	3–0		1st place	
2006–07	CEV Cup	QR	(Montenegro) Budvanska Rivijera Budva	3–2		1st place	
2006–07	CEV Cup	1/8	(Turkey) Arkas Izmir	3–2	0–3	1–1 (21–25)**	
2007–08	CEV Cup	1/16	(Hungary) Kometa Kaposvar	2–3	1–3	3–5	
2013–14	CEV Cup	1/16	(Croatia) OK Mladost MK	3–0	3–1	5–1	
2013–14	CEV Cup	1/8	(Serbia) Radnički Kragujevac	3–1	3–2	6–3	
2013–14	CEV Cup	1/4	(Germany) TV Bühl	2–3	0–3	2–6	
2015–16	CEV Champions League	Group stage	(France) Tours VB	1–3	1–3	3rd place	
2015–16	CEV Champions League	Group stage	(Italy) Trentino	1–3	0–3	3rd place	
2015–16	CEV Champions League	Group stage	(Belgium) Noliko Maaseik	3–1	0–3	3rd place	
2016–17	CEV Champions League	QR	(Croatia) OK Mladost MK	3–2	3–2	6–4	
2016–17	CEV Champions League	QR	(Poland) PGE Skra Bełchatów	0–3	1–3	1–6	
2016–17	CEV Cup	1/16	(Serbia) OK Novi Pazar	3–2	3–1	6–3	
2016–17	CEV Cup	1/8	(France) Tours VB	2–3	1–3	3–6	
2017–18	CEV Champions League	Group stage	(Turkey) Halkbank Ankara	3–1	1–3	3rd place	
2017–18	CEV Champions League	Group stage	(Germany) VfB Friedrichshafen	2–3	0–3	3rd place	
2017–18	CEV Champions League	Group stage	(Finland) Levoranta Sastamala	3-1	2–3	3rd place	
2018–19	CEV Champions League	QR	(Hungary) VRCK Kazincbarcika	3–0	3–2	6–2	
2018–19	CEV Champions League	QR	(Turkey) Istanbul BBSK	3–2	2–3	3–3 (15–13)	
2018–19	CEV Champions League	QR	(Germany) United Volleys Rhein-Main	0–3	1–3	1–6	
2018–19	CEV Cup	1/16	(Poland) Indykpol AZS Olsztyn	3–2	1–3	4–5	
2019–20	CEV Cup	1/16	(Ukraine) Barkom-Kazhany Lviv	0–3	3–1	3–3 (14–16)	
2021–22	CEV Challenge Cup	1/32	(Denmark) Middelfart VK	3–0	3–0	6–0	
2021–22	CEV Challenge Cup	1/16	(Croatia) MOK Mursa Osijek	3–0	3–0	6–0	
2021–22	CEV Challenge Cup	1/8	(Portugal) AJ Fonte Bastardo Azores	1–3	1–3	0–6	
2022–23	CEV Challenge Cup	1/32	(Switzerland) Volley Näfels	3–1	3–1	6–0	
2022–23	CEV Challenge Cup	1/16	(Bulgaria) SKV Montana	3–0	3–1	6–0	
2022–23	CEV Challenge Cup	1/8	(Israel) Maccabi Tel Aviv	2–3	1–3	1–5	
2023–24	CEV Cup	1/16	(Croatia) HAOK Mladost	3–0	3–0	6–0	
2023–24	CEV Cup	1/8	(Italy) Allianz Milano	1–3	0–3	0–6	
2024–25	CEV Challenge Cup	1/16	(Spain) CV San Roque Batan	3–0	3–1	6–1	
2024–25	CEV Challenge Cup	1/8	(Hungary) MÁV Előre SC	3–1	3–2	6–3	
2024–25	CEV Challenge Cup	QF	(Turkey) Spor Toto	1–3	0–3	1–6	
2025–26	CEV Challenge Cup	1/16	(Cyprus) Pafiakos Pafos	3–0	3–0	6–0	
2025–26	CEV Challenge Cup	1/8	(Ukraine) Epicentr-Podolyany	2–3	3–0	5–3	
2025–26	CEV Challenge Cup	QF	(Belgium) Lindemans Aalst	2–3	2–3	4–6	

- Total points system
  - Total wins system

== Notable players ==
David Lee

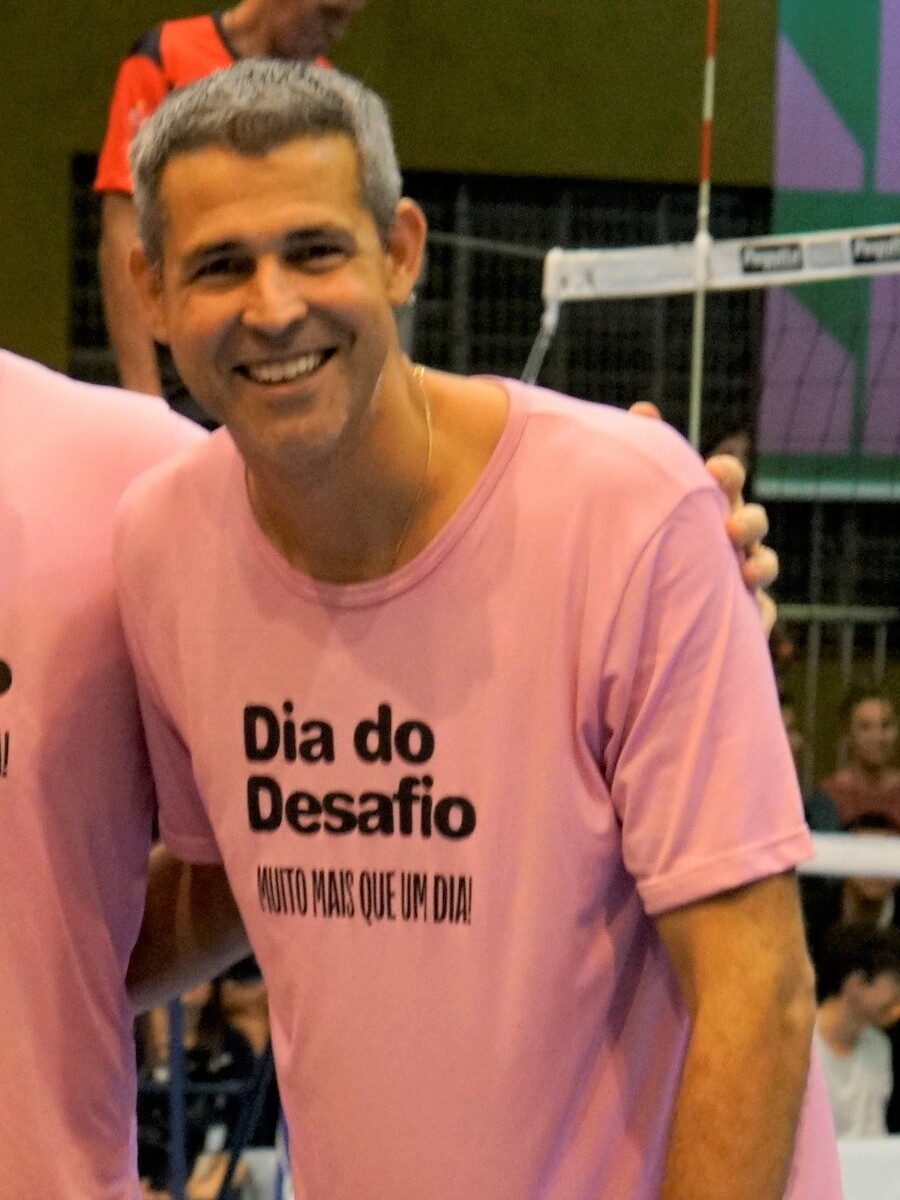
Dante Amaral

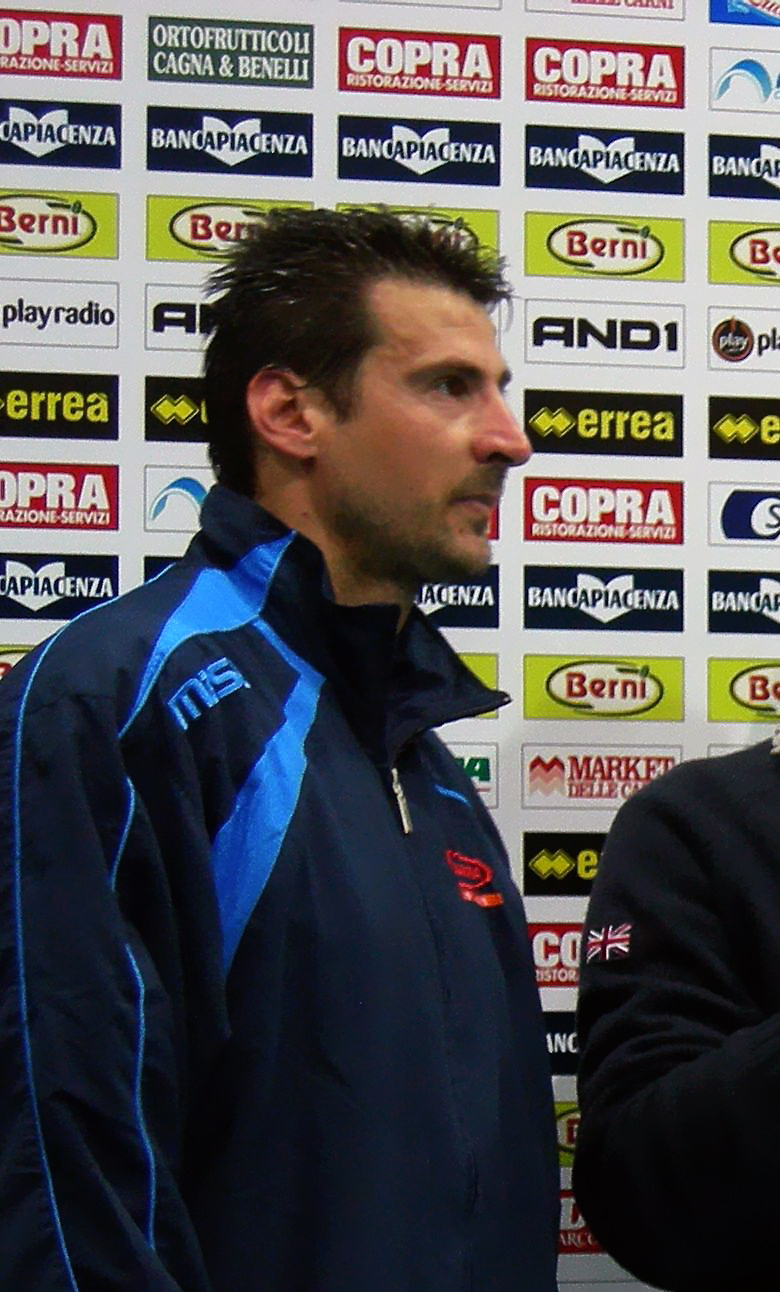
Vladimir Grbić

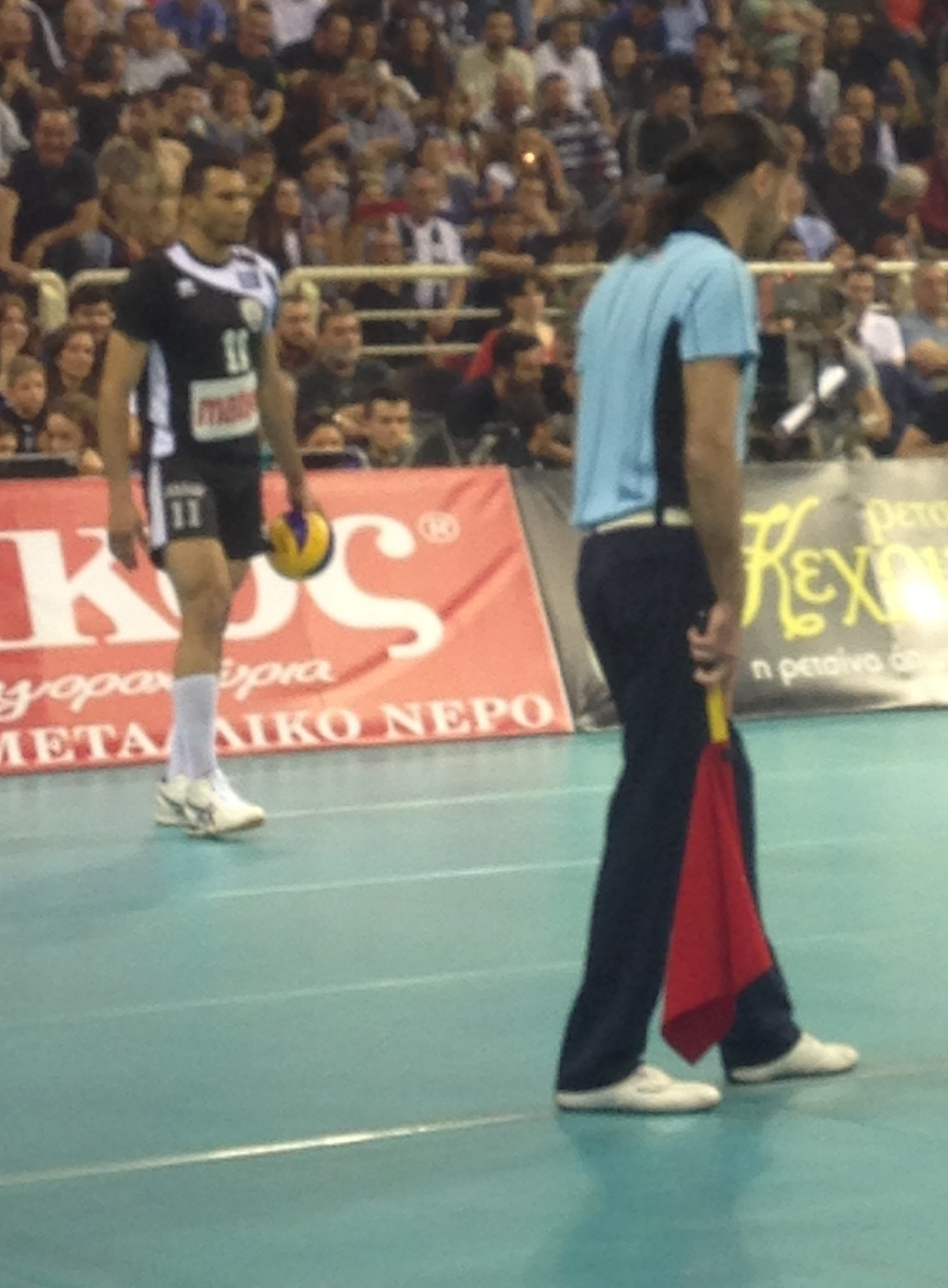
Ernardo Gómez

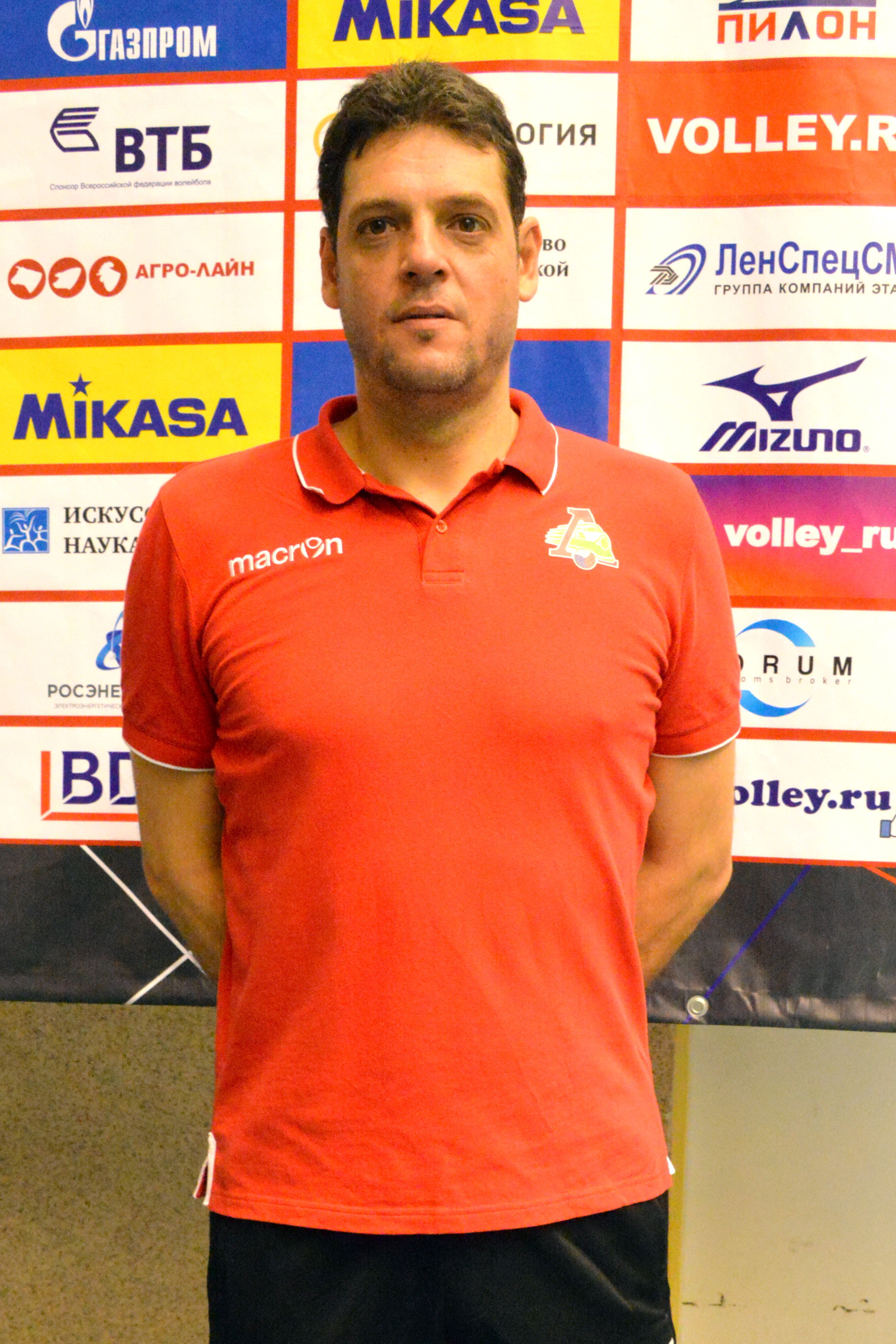
Plamen Konstantinov

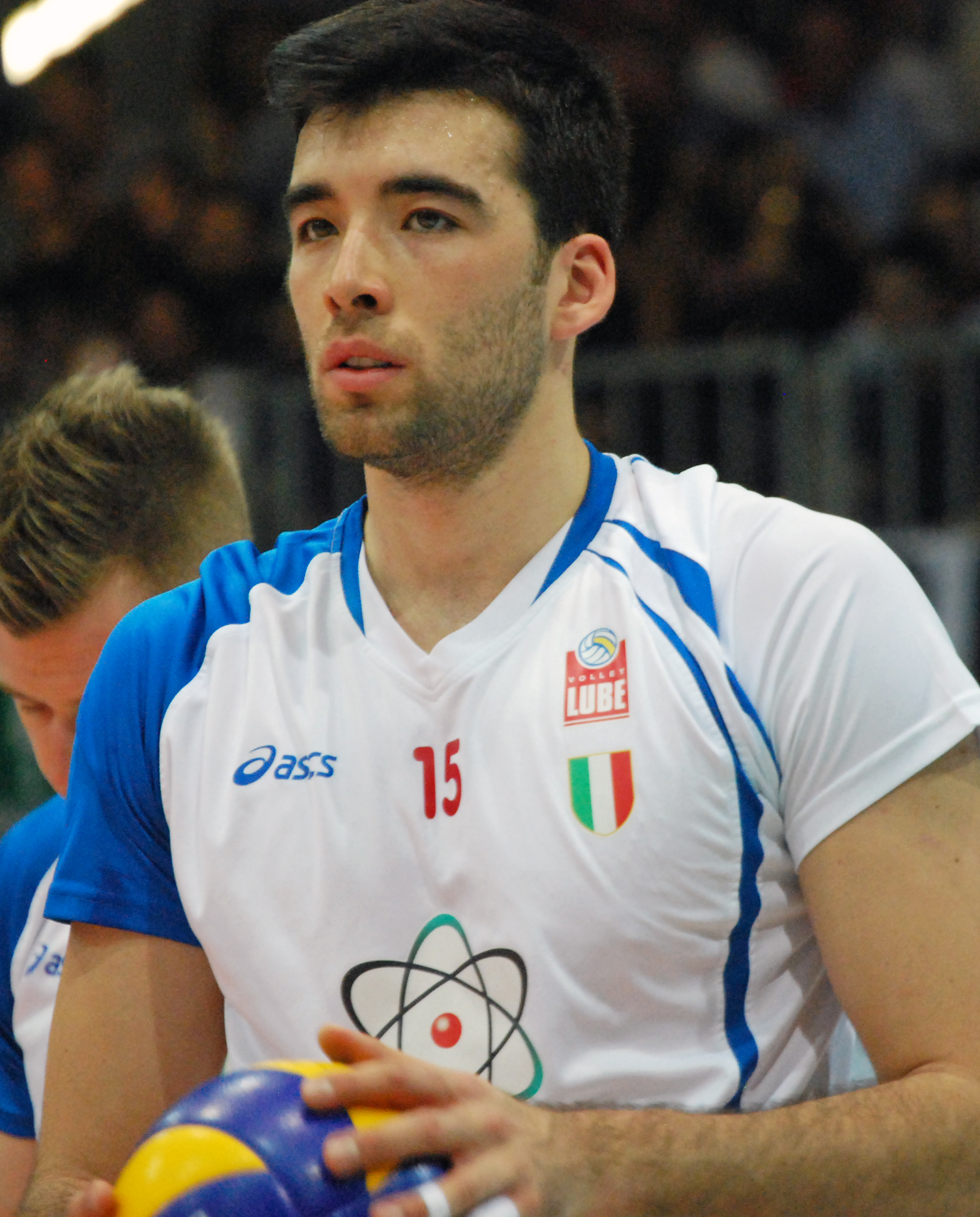
Saša Starović

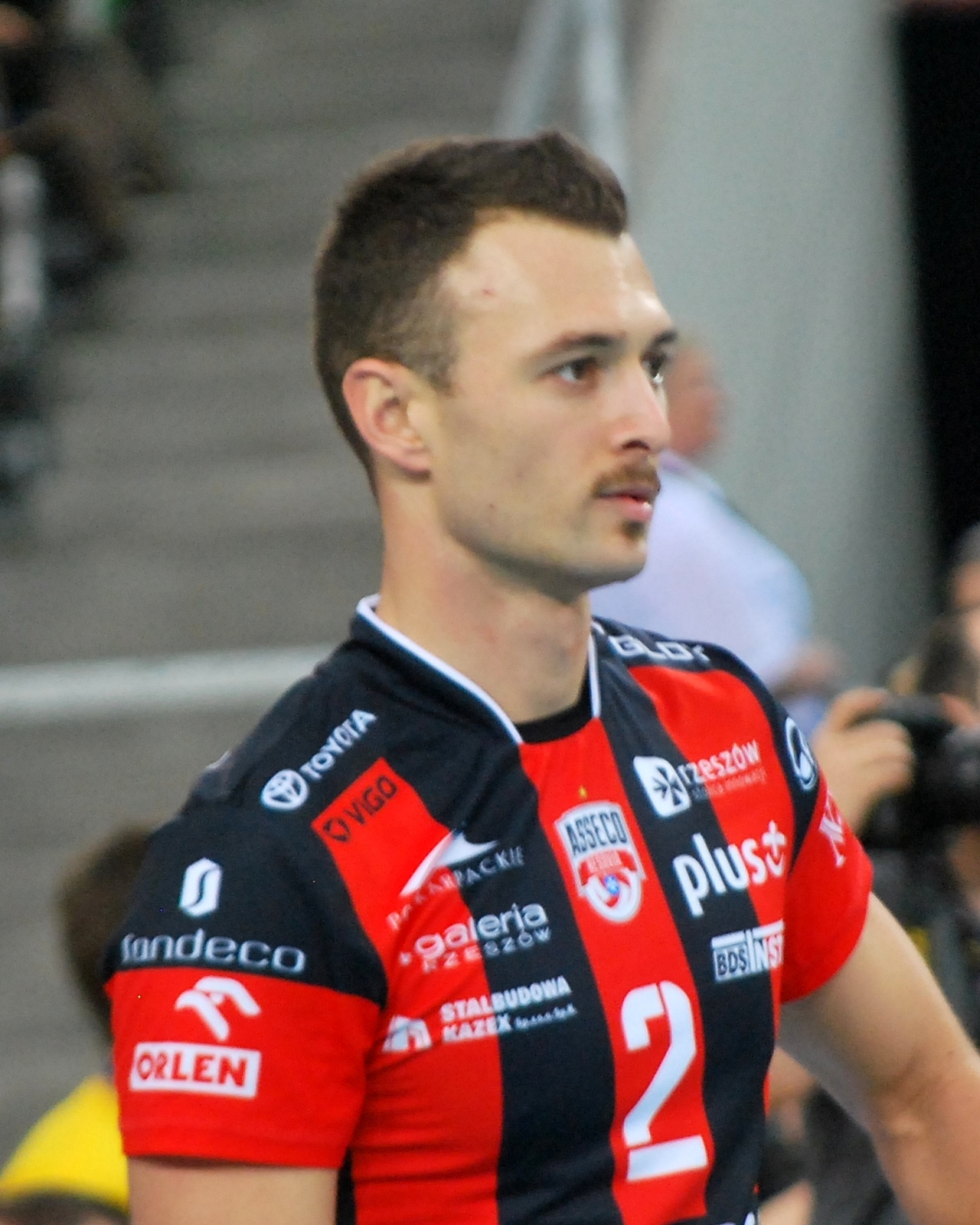
Paul Lotman

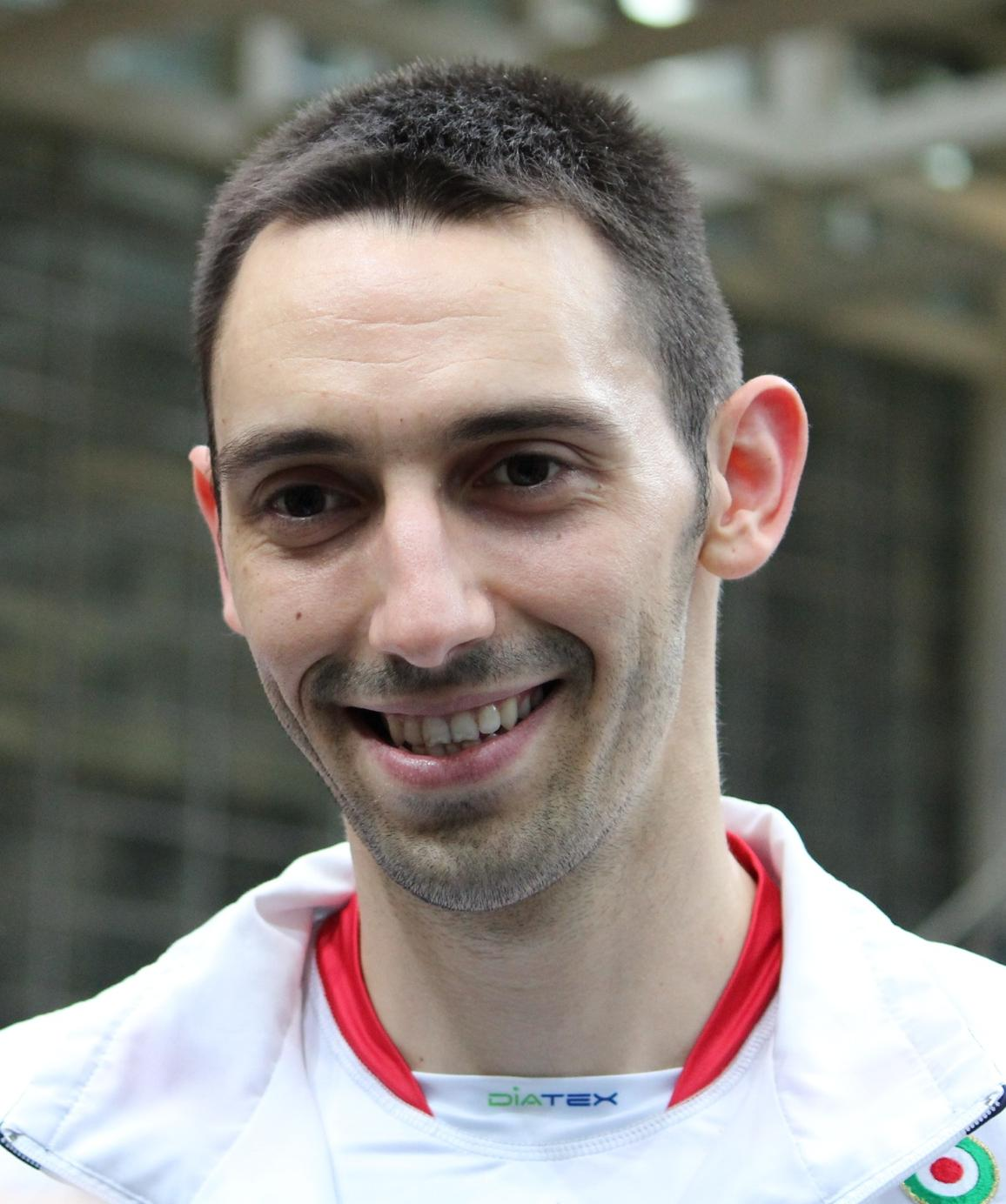
Nikolay Uchikov

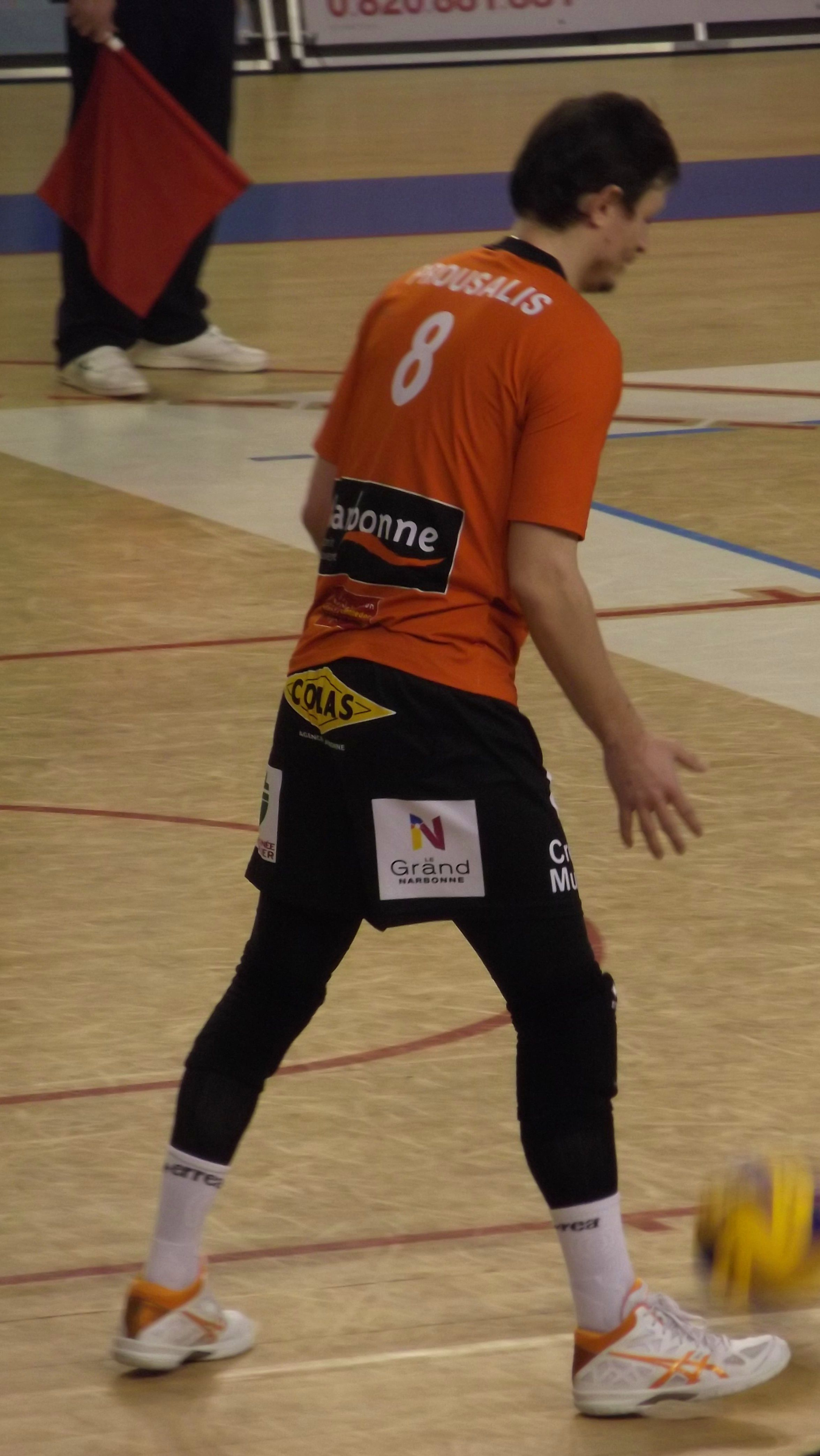
Konstantinos Prousalis

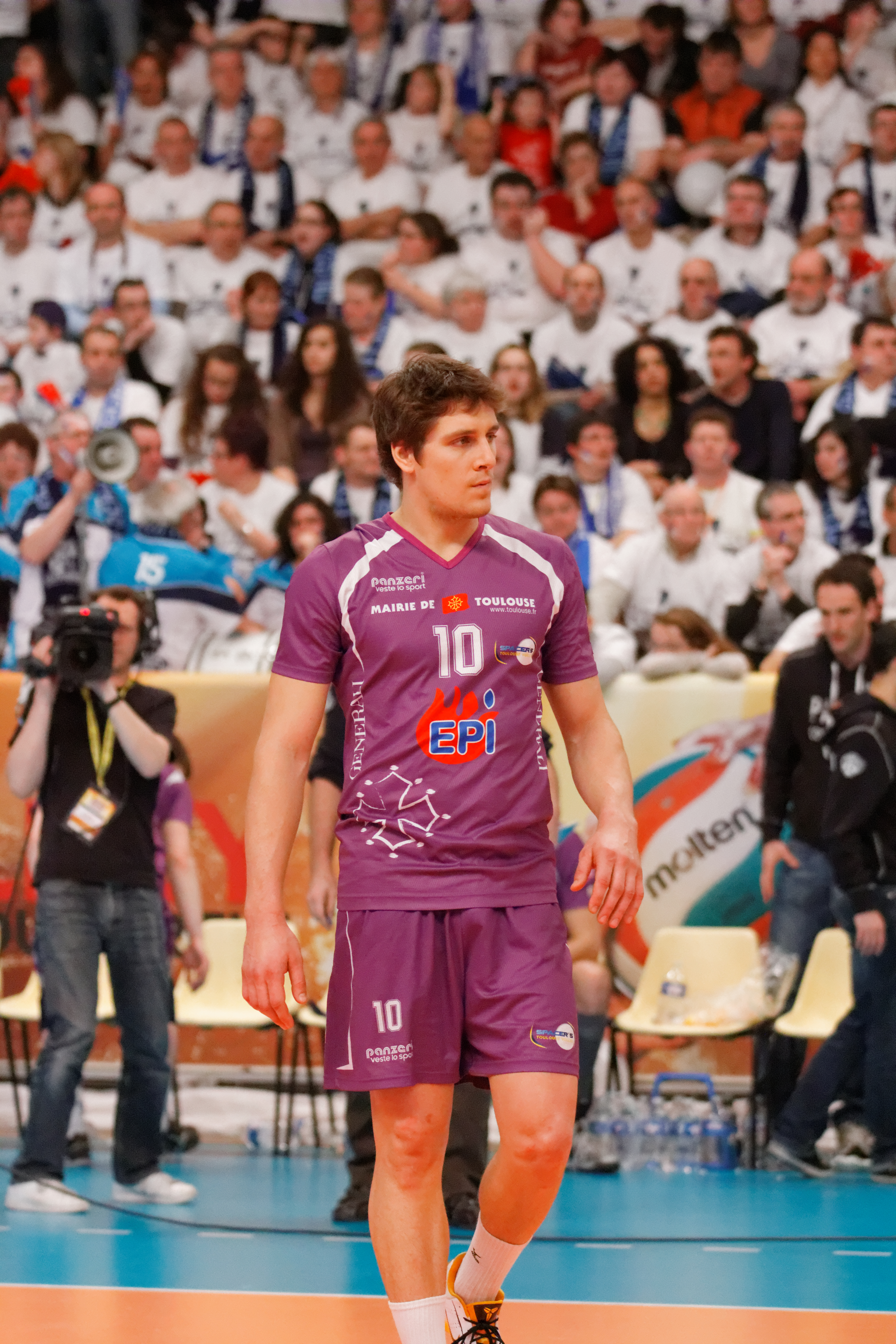
Evan Patak

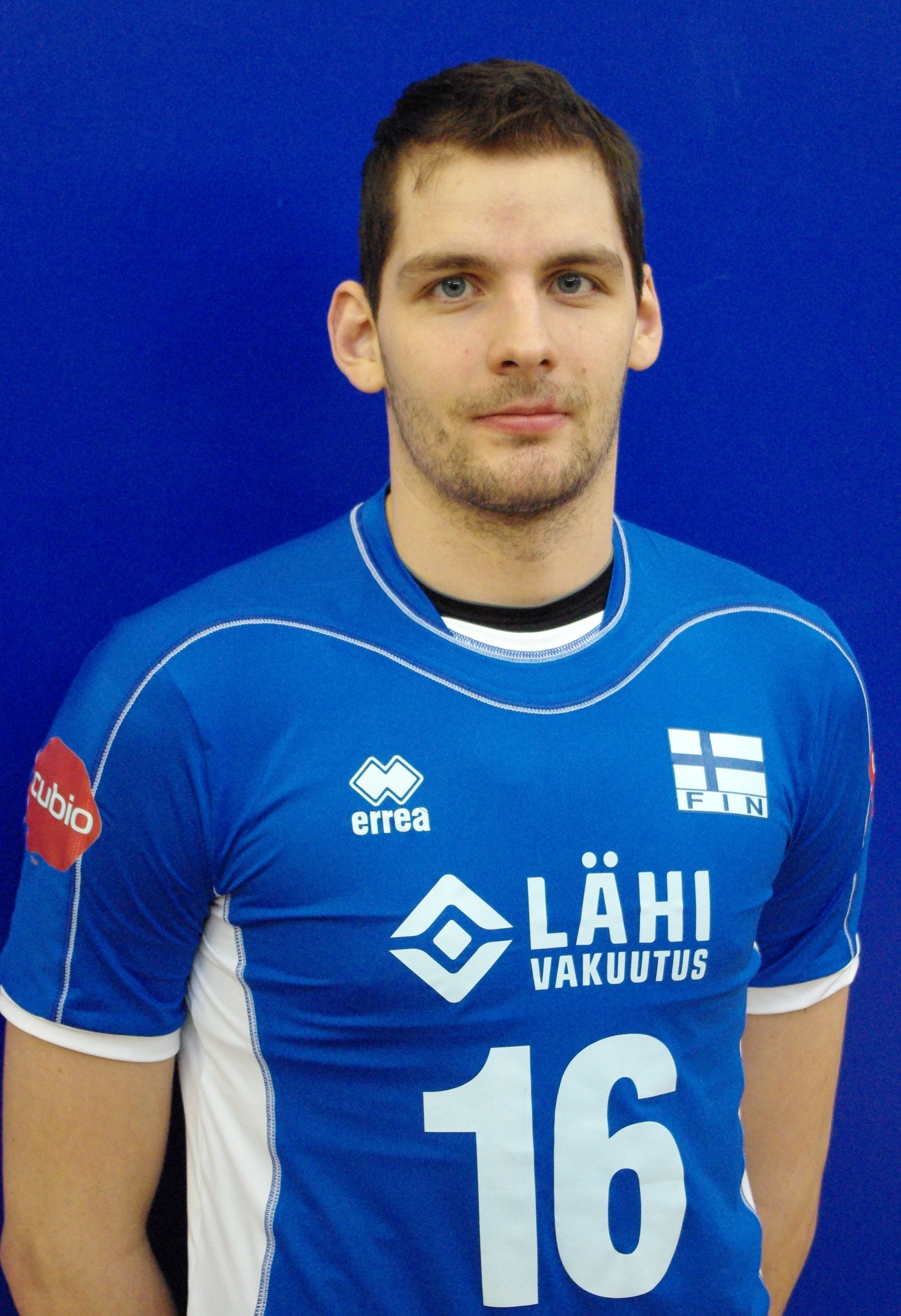
Olli-Pekka Ojansivu

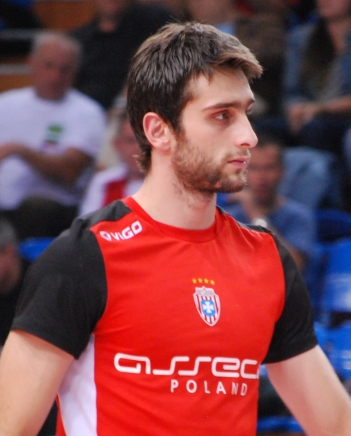
Marko Bojić

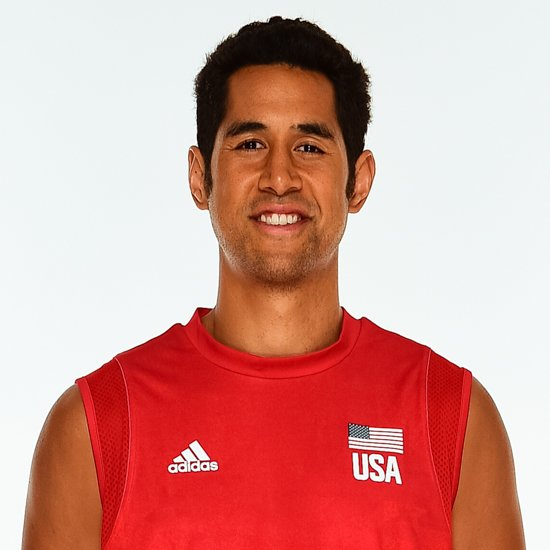
Garrett Muagututia
- Chrysanthos Kyriazis
- Vassilis Mitroudis
- Ioannis Pantakidis
- Menelaos Kokkinakis
- Dimitris Orologas
- Theodoros Bozidis
- Theoklitos Karipidis
- Giannis Kalmazidis
- Nikos Karagiannis
- Andreas Andreadis
- Georgios Stefanou
- Thanasis Psaras
- Ilias Lappas
- Giannis Melkas
- Gerasimos Kanellos
- Vasileios Kournetas
- Sotiris Amarianakis
- Giannis Charitonidis
- Konstantinos Prousalis
- Nikolaos Smaragdis
- Dimitrios Gkaras
- Sotirios Sotiriou
- Georgios Petreas
- Thanos Terzis
- Apostolos Armenakis
- Ioannis Takouridis
- Alexandros Raptis
- Panagiotis Pelekoudas
- Rafail Koumentakis
- Mitar Tzourits
- Dima Filippov
- Andrej Kravárik
- Nikolay Uchikov
- Plamen Konstantinov
- Nikolay Jeliazkov
- Ivaylo Gavrilov
- Vladimir Grbić (FIVB Hall of Fame)
- Saša Starović
- Aleksandar Okolić
- Đula Mešter
- Marko Bojić
- Jernej Potocnik
- Artur Udrys
- Dmitry Ilinikh
- Olli-Pekka Ojansivu
- Matti Hietanen
- Ralph Bergmann
- Matthias Valkiers
- Bram Van Den Dries
- Ronald Zoodsma
- Niels Klapwijk
- Alexander Shafranovich
- Yoichi Kato
- David Lee
- Kevin Hansen
- Michael Lambert
- Paul Lotman
- Evan Patak
- James Polster
- Riley Salmon
- Clayton Stanley
- Michael Diehl
- Kyle Robinson
- Jayson Jablonsky
- Garrett Muagututia
- Steven Marshall
- Brett Walsh
- Dante Amaral
- Ernardo Gómez
- Javier Jiménez
- Rolando Cepeda
- Freddy Brooks

== Notable coaches ==
- Sotiris Ieroklis
- Ilias Ieroklis
- Stelios Kazazis
- Alekos Leonis
- Giannis Melkas
- Kostas Charitonidis
- Giannis Kalmazidis
- Jorge Elgueta
- Danielle Ricci
- Yuriy Filippov
- Joško Milenkoski

== See also ==
- PAOK Women's Volleyball Club

== Sponsorships ==
- Official Sponsor: OPAP, Sportingbet
- Official Sport Clothing Manufacturer: Legea
- Official Broadcaster: Nova Sports
