= Rolando Cepeda =

Cuban volleyball player (born 1989)

Rolando Cepeda Abreu
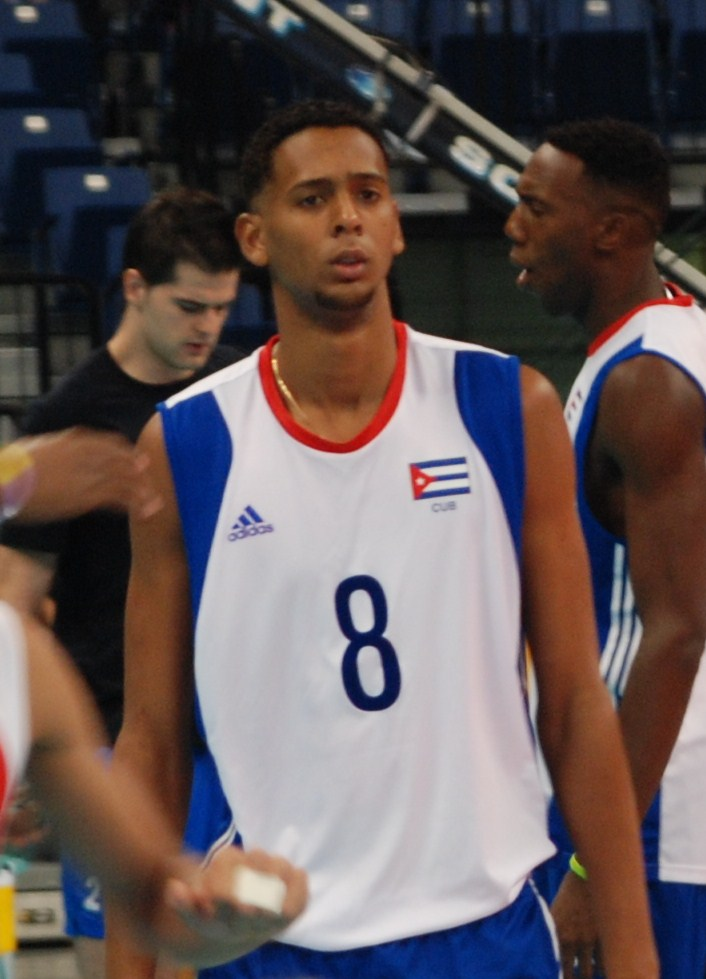

Personal information
- Full name: Rolando Cepeda Abreu
- Born: 13 March 1989 (age 37)
- Hometown: Havana, Cuba
- Height: 198 cm (6 ft 6 in)
- Weight: 77 kg (170 lb)
- Spike: 359 cm (141 in)
- Block: 344 cm (135 in)

Volleyball information
- Position: Opposite hitter
- Current club: Bursa Büyükşehir Belediyesi
- Number: 8 (national team)

Career
Years	Teams
2004–2015; 2015–2016; 2016; 2018–2019; 2019–2020; 2020–2021; 2021–2022; 2023–2024; 2024–	(Cuba) Sancti Spiritus (Greece) PAOK Thessaloniki (South Korea) OK Savings Bank (Turkey) Inegöl Belediyesi; Kuwait SC (Turkey) Sorgun Belediyespor; Kuwait SC (Turkey) Develi Belediyespor (Turkey) Bursa Büyükşehir Belediyespor

National team
2009–2016	Cuba
Honours
Representing Cuba
Men's volleyball
World Championship
Silver medal – second place	2010 Italy
FIVB World League
Bronze medal – third place	2012 Sofia

Rolando Cepeda Abreu (born 13 March 1989) is a Cuban volleyball player. Abreu was the captain of the Cuban men's national volleyball team. He was one of the key players that contributed to 2015–16 Greek Volleyleague Championship for PAOK VC, making it the first team ever to win a championship in Greece starting from the fourth place in the playoffs. He was named the 2015–16 Greek Volleyleague MVP.

Abreu did not play in the Rio Olympics in 2016 for being one of the six players of the Cuban national volleyball team that were remanded into custody suspected of committing aggravated rape in July 2016 in Tampere, Finland. Following a conviction, Abreu was sentenced to two and a half years of prison.

== Sporting achievements ==
=== National Championships/Cups ===
- 2015/2016 Greek Championship, with PAOK

=== Individual ===
- 2013 Cuban Championship – Most valuable player
- 2013 Cuban Championship – Best scorer
- 2013 Cuban Championship – Best server
- 2013 NORCECA Championship – Best scorer
- 2014 Pan-American Cup – Most valuable player
- 2015 NORCECA Championship – Best outside spiker
- 2016 Greek Championship – Most valuable player
- 2019 Turkish Championship – Best outside spiker
- 2019 Turkish Cup – Best outside spiker
