= Panachaiki Volleyball Club =

Volleyball team in Greece

Panachaiki V.C.
- Founded: 1928
- Ground: Panachaiki Gymnasium

Uniforms
Home	Away

Panachaiki Volleyball Club is the volleyball department of Panachaiki, a multi-sport club based in Patras. It was founded in 1928. Its home is the Panachaiki Indoor Hall. In the 2013-14 season the team played in the A1 Ethniki (first division) for the first time.

== History ==
Panachaiki participated in the 1937-38 Panhellenic championship. The final stage of this championship took place in Patras and the winner was E.A. Patras, the other volleyball Club of Patras. Panachaiki also took place in the 1961-62 Panhellenic championship but was disqualified early. Since the 1970s, Panachaiki has been mostly participating in Gamma and Beta Ethniki (fourth and third division respectively).
In the 2007-08 season, it was promoted to the A2 Ethniki (second division) for the first time. In the 2012-13 season, they finished first of their group. After the end of the regular season, the team won the special ascension tournament and it was promoted to the A1 Ethniki for the first time.
In the 2015-16 season Panachaiki finished in the 8th place of the Volleyball League, which is the team's most important success so far.

=== Recent seasons ===
Season	Division	Position	Notes
2006-07	Gamma Ethniki		Promoted to Beta
2007-08	Beta Ethniki		Promoted to A2 Ethniki
2008-09	A2 Ethniki	7th	
2009-10	A2 Ethniki	4th	
2010-11	A2 Ethniki	5th	
2011-12	A2 Ethniki	10th	
2012-13	A2 Ethniki	1st	Promoted to A1 Ethniki
2013-14	A1 Ethniki	11th	Relegated to A2 Ethniki
2014-15	A2 Ethniki	2nd	Promoted to A1 Ethniki
2015-16	A1 Ethniki	8th	
2016-17	A1 Ethniki	10th	
2017-18	A1 Ethniki	12th	Relegated to A2 Ethniki
