= A.C. Orestias =

Greek volleyball club

- Full name: Athletic Club of Orestias
- Founded: 1970
- Ground: Nikos Samaras Indoor Hall (Capacity: 2,500)
- League: Beta Ethniki

Uniforms
Home	Away

A.C. Orestias (full name Athletic Club of Orestias/ Greek: Αθλητικός Όμιλος Ορεστιάδας) is a Greek volleyball club based in Orestias. It was founded in 1970 and it has important presence in the Greek volleyball championship. Orestias was the finalist of the championship at three times and one time the finalist of the Greek cup. Nevertheless the most important moment was the presence of the club in the final of the CEV Challenge Cup, in 1995.

== History ==
A.C. Orestias was founded in 1970. The first presence in the A1 Ethniki championship was in 1984. Since 1989, Orestias was one of the most powerful teams in the championship. At those years Orestias had notable players such as Nikos Samaras and Theodoros Baev. The club played three times in the finals of the championship and one time in the final of the cup. In 1995, Orestias reached to the final of the CEV Challenge Cup but was defeated by Pallavolo Parma. The decline of Orestias started with the relegation in 2007. Orestias remained seven years in the lower division. In 2014 the club returned to the highest level again. In 2017 and 2018, the club relegated in back to back years and is now competing in Beta Ethinki.

Season	Division	Place	Notes
1990-91	A1 Ethniki	4th	
1991-92	A1 Ethniki	5th	
1992-93	A1 Ethniki	2nd	Greek Cup runner-up
1993-94	A1 Ethniki	3rd	4th place in CEV Cup
1994-95	A1 Ethniki	3rd	Challenge Cup runner-up
1995-96	A1 Ethniki	3rd	4th place in Challenge Cup
1996-97	A1 Ethniki	2nd	
1997-98	A1 Ethniki	2nd	
1998-99	A1 Ethniki	3rd	
1999-00	A1 Ethniki	3rd	4th place in Challenge Cup
2000-01	A1 Ethniki	4th	
2001-02	A1 Ethniki	4th	
2002-03	A1 Ethniki	9th	
2003-04	A1 Ethniki	6th	
2004-05	A1 Ethniki	9th	
2005-06	A1 Ethniki	8th	
2006-07	A1 Ethniki	11th	Relegated to A2 Ethniki
2007-08	A2 Ethniki	3rd	
2008-09	A2 Ethniki	12th	Relegated to Beta Ethniki
2009-10	Beta Ethniki	3rd	
2010-11	Beta Ethniki	1st	Promoted to A2 Ethniki
2011-12	A2 Ethniki	5th	
2012-13	A2 Ethniki	3rd	
2013-14	A2 Ethniki	2nd	Promoted to A1 Ethniki
2014-15	A1 Ethniki	8th	
2015-16	A1 Ethniki	9th	
2016-17	A1 Ethniki	12th	Relegated to A2 Ethniki
2017-18	A2 Ethniki	8th	Relegated to Beta Ethniki
2018-19	Beta Ethniki	5th	

== Honours ==
- CEV Challenge Cup
  - Finalist (1): 1995
- Greek Championship
  - Finalist (3): 1992, 1997, 1998
- Greek Volleyball Cup
  - Finalist (1): 1993

Youth Departments

- Young Men
  - 6 Greek Championships:1988,1991,1992, 1993,1995,1996
- Cadets
  - 5 Greek Championships:1989,1991,1992, 1993,2000
