= Greek Volleyball Super Cup =

- Sport: Volleyball
- Founded: 1997
- No. of teams: 2
- Country: Greece
- Most recent champions: Panathinaikos Athens (3rd title)
- Most titles: Olympiacos Piraeus and Iraklis (4 titles each)

The Greek Volleyball Super Cup is a volleyball club competition that takes place in Greece since 1998. It is an annual match contested by the champions of Greek Volleyleague and the Greek Volleyball Cup winners. The matches take place in different cities and various dates every year. The competition usually was not held when a team has achieved the double. However, there have been times when a match called "Super Game" has been held, between the champions and the Cup runners-up, that the Volleyball Federation recognizes as the Super Cup final.
Olympiacos and Iraklis are the most successful clubs with 4 titles each.

== Title holders ==
- 1997: Aris Thessaloniki
- 2000: Olympiacos Piraeus
- 2004: Iraklis Thessaloniki
- 2005: Iraklis Thessaloniki
- 2006: Panathinaikos Athens
- 2007: Iraklis Thessaloniki
- 2008: Iraklis Thessaloniki
- 2010: Olympiacos Piraeus
- 2021: Foinikas Syros
- 2022: Panathinaikos Athens
- 2023: PAOK Thessaloniki
- 2024: Olympiacos ONEX
- 2025: Olympiacos ONEX
- 2026: Panathinaikos Athens

== The matches ==
Season	Champions	Score	Cup Winners	Sets	Location	source
1996–97	Aris Thessaloniki	3–0	Olympiacos Piraeus	15−11, 15−6, 15−8	Nea Ionia, Volos	
1997–98	Olympiacos Piraeus won the Double					
1998–99	Olympiacos Piraeus won the Double					
1999–00	Olympiacos Piraeus	3–1	Iraklis Thessaloniki	20−25, 25−19, 25−23, 26−24	Thessaloniki	
2000–01	Olympiacos Piraeus won the Double					
2001–02	Iraklis Thessaloniki won the Double					
2002–03	Olympiacos Piraeus	–	A.E. Nikaia	Not Held		
2003–04	Panathinaikos	1–3	Iraklis Thessaloniki	24−26, 14−25, 25−18, 20−25	Larissa	
2004–05^{*1}	Iraklis Thessaloniki	3–0	Olympiacos Piraeus	25−21, 25−21, 25−18	Lamia	
2005–06	Panathinaikos	3–0	Iraklis Thessaloniki	25−21, 25−21, 25−18	Lamia	
2006–07	Iraklis Thessaloniki	3–2	Panathinaikos	25−20, 19−25, 25−23, 20−25, 15−11	Thessaloniki	
2007–08	Iraklis Thessaloniki	3–2	Panathinaikos	16−25, 25−20, 16−25, 25−16, 15−13	Larissa	
2008–09	Olympiacos Piraeus won the Double					
2009–10	Olympiacos Piraeus	3–1	Panathinaikos	18−25, 25−15, 25−21, 25−18	Thira	
2010–11	Olympiacos Piraeus won the Double					
2011–12	Iraklis Thessaloniki won the Double					
2012–13	Olympiacos Piraeus won the Double					
2013–14	Olympiacos Piraeus won the Double					
2014–15	PAOK won the Double					
2015–16	PAOK	–	Olympiacos Piraeus	Not Held		
2016–17	PAOK	–	Olympiacos Piraeus	Not Held		
2017–18	Olympiacos Piraeus	–	PAOK	Not Held		
2018–19	Olympiacos Piraeus	–	PAOK	Not Held		
2019–20^{*2}	Panathinaikos	–	–	Not Held		
2020–21^{*3}	Olympiacos Piraeus	0–3	Foinikas Syros	23−25, 25−27, 27−29	Rhodes	
2021-22	Panathinaikos	3–1	PAOK	25−20, 32−34, 25−19, 25−22	Heraklion	
2022–23	Olympiacos Piraeus	2–3	PAOK	25−27, 25−21, 20−25, 25−18, 12−15	Piraeus	
2023–24^{*4}	Olympiacos Piraeus	3–1	Milon Nea Smyrni	29–27, 20–25, 25–20, 25–21	Palaio Faliro	
2024–25	Panathinaikos	2–3	Olympiacos ONEX	25–20, 25–15, 20–25, 17–25, 24–26, 09–15	Markopoulo	
2025–26					Markopoulo	
2026–27	Panathinaikos	3–0	Flisvos Paleo Faliro	25-21, 25-15, 25-15	Markopoulo	

Notes:

- 1 In 2005, Iraklis achieved the Double. Olympiacos were the Championship and Cup runners-up. That match was named Super Game and is recognized by the Hellenic Volleyball Federation as a Super Cup Final.
- 2 In 2020, the Greek Cup was abandoned in the semi-finals due to the COVID-19 pandemic.
- 3 In 2021, the Greek Cup was cancelled due to the COVID-19 pandemic. Foinikas Syros were the League Cup winners and participated in the Super Cup Final.
- 4 In the 2023-24 season Olympiacos Piraeus achieved the double. Milon Nea Smyrni were the Cup runners-up. That match was named Super Game and is also recognized by the Hellenic Volleyball Federation as a Super Cup Final.

== Performance by club ==
Club	Winners	Runners-up	Winning years	Runners-up years
Olympiacos Piraeus	4	4	2000, 2010, 2024, 2025	1997, 2005, 2021, 2023
Iraklis Thessaloniki	4	2	2004, 2005, 2007, 2008	2000, 2006
Panathinaikos Athens	3	5	2006, 2022, 2026	2004, 2007, 2008, 2010, 2025
PAOK Thessaloniki	1	1	2023	2022
Aris Thessaloniki	1	-	1997	
Foinikas Syros	1	-	2021	
