= Kifissia V.C. =

Greek volleyball club

== Staff ==
Head Coach 2025-2026 season was Nikolaos Zalmas, the assistant coach is Nikolaos Grezias.

Head Strength and Conditioning coach Panagiotis Roxanas, Assistant Strength and Conditioning Coach Stefanos Morellas and Physiotherapist Andreas Tzanis

During the last eight years, Kifissia has played continually in the A1 Ethniki. It usually

AOP Kifissia
- Full name: Athlitikos Omilos Petosfairisis Kifissias/Kifissia Volleyball Club
- Founded: 1932
- Ground: Zirineio Indoor Hall (Capacity: 800)
- Manager: Kostas Christofidelis
- League: A1
- 2022–23: 6th
- Website: Club home page

Uniforms
Home	Away

Kifissia V.C. (Kifissia Volleyball Club; Greek: Α.Ο.Π. Κηφισιάς A.O.P. Kifissias, former Α.Ο. Κηφισιάς) is a volleyball club which was founded in 1932 in Kifissia, a town and a suburb in Athens urban area, Greece. The club was firstly founded under the name A.O. Kifissia but in 2015, it absorbed Metamorfosi V.C. and renamed A.O.P Kifissia (Athlitikos Omilos Petosferisis Kifissias/Kifissia Volleyball Club). The club plays at the Zirineio Indoor Ball, which holds 800 people.

The team plays at the A1 division of the Greek Volleyball Championships. The club ranked 6th in the 2007–08 season, while in 2013-2014 it ended up in the third place of the league, the best result in its history. A.O. Kifissia also took the second place in the Balkan Championships.

== Recent seasons ==
During the last eight years, Kifissia has played continually in the A1 Ethniki. It usually finishes in medium or low places of the championship.

Season	Division	Place	Notes
2006-07	A2 Ethniki	1st	Promoted to A1 Ethniki
2007-08	A1 Ethniki	6th	
2008-09	A1 Ethniki	9th	
2009-10	A1 Ethniki	10th	
2010-11	A1 Ethniki	8th	
2011-12	A1 Ethniki	9th	
2012-13	A1 Ethniki	7th	Finalist League Cup
2013-14	A1 Ethniki	3rd	Finalist Greek Cup
2014-15	A1 Ethniki	5th	
2015-16	A1 Ethniki	4th	Finalist Greek Cup
2016-17	A1 Ethniki	5th	Finalist Greek Cup
2017-18	A1 Ethniki	4th	
2018-19	A1 Ethniki	4th	
2019-20	A1 Ethniki	5th	
2020-21	A1 Ethniki	5th	
2021-22	A1 Ethniki	6th	

== Honours ==
- Greek Volleyball Cup
  - Finalist (3): 2014, 2016, 2017
- Greek Volleyball League Cup
  - Finalist (1): 2013
- Balkan Volleyball Championships:
  - 2008-09: 2nd

== Current squad ==
2016–2017 roster

Number	Player	Position	Height (m)
2	(Ukraine) Valentyn Burkovskyi	Middle blocker	2.05
3	(Greece) Konstantinos Christofidelis	Outside hitter	1.95
4	(Greece) Giorgos Kapelas	Libero	1.88
8	(Greece) Giannis Papadopoulos	Outside Hitter	1.92
9	(Slovenia) Zlatko Pulko	Outside hitter	1.95
10	(Greece) Nikos Papaggelopoulos	Middle blocker	2.02
11	(Bulgaria) Boyan Yordanov	Opposite	1.97
12	(Greece) Kostas Tampouratzis	Libero	1.91
13	(Greece) Menelaos Frangiadakis	Middle blocker	1.98
14	(Greece) Nikos Karatzas	Middle blocker	2.00
16	(Greece) Spyros Veloudis	Libero	1.72
18	(Greece) Nikos Gavriil	Setter	1.88
19	(Greece) Christos Oikonomopoulos	Outside hitter	1.87
20	(Greece) Nikos Giotakis	Outside hitter	1.87
