= Aris Thessaloniki Volleyball Club =

Greek volleyball club

Aris Thessaloniki Volleyball Club is the professional volleyball team of A.C. Aris Thessaloniki, the major multi-sport club of Thessaloniki, Greece. Aris VC participates in the Pre League and it is one of the most historical teams of the whole club and of the most stable values of the Greek volleyball, inside and outside its borders.

== History ==
Aris was the first team to end Olympiacos and Panathinaikos domination of the sport, conquering the Greek Championship in 1997. Aris' roster, that period, was the strongest the club ever had, as it included top scorers Ganev, Konstantinov and some of the most capable Greek players then available: Alexandropoulos, Papakosmas, Melkas, Mitroudis, Chatziantoniou etc.

The club has to demonstrate a decent presence in the Greek Cup as well, having reached the final five times. The fact that they had to play all the finals against the season's champions (Olympiacos 4 times and Iraklis 1 time), prevented Aris from winning even one of them. However, they won the Super Cup in 1997. The following season they participated in the Champions League, with a remarkable presence and especially a 3-0 road win against European champion Modena.

On 9 February 2002, Aris Thessaloniki set a record for one of the longest sets played in men's volleyball worldwide, when it played against A.E. Nikaia for 44 minutes and 42 seconds.

== Honours ==
=== Domestic ===
Greek Volleyball League:

- Winners (1): 1996–97
- Runners-up (2): 1993–94, 1995–96,

Greek Super Cup:

- Winners (1): 1997

Greek Cup:

- Runners-up (5): 1988–89, 1991–92, 1996–97, 1997–98, 2001–02

=== International ===
CEV Cup:

- Semi Finalists (2): 1993–94, 1995–96

== Recent men's volleyball squad ==
Season 2018-2019

Number	Player	Position	Height (m)	Date of birth
1	(Greece) Nikolaos Skarlatidis	Setter	1.86	11/03/1998
2	(Greece) Alexandros Antoniadis	Libero	1.84	19/06/1986
3	(Greece) Vassileios Christopoulos	Middle blocker	1.86	13/01/1986
4	(Greece) Konstantinos Telios	Outside hitter	1.94	12/04/1997
5	(Greece) Christos Gitersos	Setter	1.93	07/04/2000
6	(Greece) Georgios Karantaidis	Middle blocker	1.93	05/06/1999
7	(Greece) Argyris Zavopoulos	Opposite	1.87	15/01/1989
9	(Greece) Konstantinos Angouras	Middle blocker	1.91	19/05/1982
10	(Greece) Panagiotis Kalfas	Libero	1.80	31/08/2000
11	(Greece) Alexandros Alexakis	Middle blocker	2.03	19/04/2000
12	(Greece) Georgios Tellios	Outside hitter	1.86	01/01/2000
13	(Greece) Napoleon Frangkoulidis	Outside hitter	1.92	12/10/2000
14	(Greece) Konstantinos Tsangalidis (C)	Outside hitter	1.90	12/05/1991
15	(Greece) Dimitrios Papazacharias	Outside hitter	1.85	28/9/1979
18	(Greece) Nikitas Vildiridis	Opposite	1.85	09/04/1998

=== Technical and managerial staff ===
Staff
Coach	(Serbia) Čedomir Ilić
Technical Director	(Greece) Ioannis Varvoutas
Physio	(Greece) Konstantinos-Rafail Mittas
Conditioner	(Greece) Dimitrios Papaefthimiou

== Notable players ==
- (Bulgaria) Lyubomir Ganev
- (Bulgaria) Plamen Konstantinov
- (Greece) Michalis Alexandropoulos
- (Greece) Nikos Doukas
- (Greece) Andrej Kravárik
- (Greece) Giorgos Lykoudis
- (Greece) Giannis Melkas
- (Greece) Thanassis Moustakidis
- (Greece) Dimitris Modiotis
- (Greece) Vasilis Mitroudis
- (Greece) Kostas Prousalis
- (Greece) Nikos Roumeliotis
- (Greece) Nikos Smaragdis
- (Greece) Sokratis Tzoumakas
- (Greece) Sotiris Sotiriou
- (United States) Riley Salmon
- (United States) Clayton Stanley
- (Serbia) Jakovljevic Milos

== Notable coaches ==
- (Greece) Sotiris Ieroklis
- (Greece) Giorgos Kosmatos
- (Greece) Notis Litsas
- (Greece) Kostas Charitonidis

== Sponsorships ==
- Official Sponsor: Joker, Euromedica
- Official Broadcaster: Nova Sports

== See also ==
- Aris Thessaloniki Women's Volleyball
- Aris Thessaloniki
- Aris Thessaloniki F.C.
- Aris BC
