= Greece at the 1996 Summer Olympics =

- IOC code: GRE
- NOC: Committee of the Olympic Games
- Website: www.hoc.gr (in Greek and English)

in Atlanta United States
- Competitors: 121 (87 men, 34 women) in 18 sports
- Flag bearers: Pyrros Dimas (opening); Nikolaos Kaklamanakis (closing)
- Medals Ranked 16th: Gold 4 Silver 4 Bronze 0 Total 8

Summer Olympics appearances (overview)
- 1896; 1900; 1904; 1908; 1912; 1920; 1924; 1928; 1932; 1936; 1948; 1952; 1956; 1960; 1964; 1968; 1972; 1976; 1980; 1984; 1988; 1992; 1996; 2000; 2004; 2008; 2012; 2016; 2020; 2024

Other related appearances
- 1906 Intercalated Games

Greece competed at the 1996 Summer Olympics in Atlanta, United States. Greek athletes have competed in every Summer Olympic Games. 121 competitors, 87 men and 34 women, took part in 94 events in 18 sports.

== Medalists ==
Greece finished in 16th position in the final medal rankings, with four gold medals and four silver medals.

=== Gold ===
- Ioannis Melissanidis — Gymnastics, Men's Floor Exercises
- Nikolaos Kaklamanakis — Sailing, Men's Sailboard (Mistral)
- Pyrros Dimas — Weightlifting, Men's Light Heavyweight (83 kg)
- Kakhi Kakhiashvili — Weightlifting, Men's Heavyweight (99 kg)

=== Silver ===
- Niki Bakogianni — Athletics, Women's High Jump
- Leonidas Sampanis — Weightlifting, Men's Bantamweight (59 kg)
- Valerios Leonidis — Weightlifting, Men's Featherweight (64 kg)
- Leonidas Kokas — Weightlifting, Men's Middle Heavyweight (91 kg)

== Athletics ==
Men's Long Jump

- Spyridon Vasdekis

- Qualification — 7.98m (→ did not advance)

- Kostas Koukodimos

- Qualification — 7.82m (→ did not advance)

Men's Marathon

- Spyros Andriopoulos — 2:19.41 (→ 36th place)

Men's Hammer Throw

- Alexandros Papadimitriou

- Qualification — 74.46m (→ did not advance)

- Hristos Polihroniou

- Qualification — NM (→ did not advance)

Women's High Jump

- Niki Bakogianni

- Qualification — 1.93m
- Final — 2.03m (→ Silver Medal)

Women's Long Jump

- Niki Xanthou

- Qualification — 6.60m
- Final — 6.97m (→ 4th place)

- Voula Patoulidou

- Qualification — 6.58m
- Final — 6.37m (→ 11th place)

Women's Discus Throw

- Styliani Tsikouna

- Qualification — 56.66m (→ did not advance)

- Anastasia Kelesidou

- Qualification — 59.60m (→ did not advance)

- Ekaterini Voggoli

- Qualification — 58.70m (→ did not advance)

Women's Triple Jump

- Olga Vasdeki

- Qualification — 14.48m
- Final — 14.44m (→ 6th place)

Women's Marathon

- Maria Polizou — 2:41.33 (→ 42nd place)

== Basketball ==
=== Men's tournament ===
Preliminary round

Pos	Team	Pld	W	L	PF	PA	PD	Pts	Qualification
1	FR Yugoslavia	5	5	0	478	364	+114	10	Quarterfinals
2	Australia	5	4	1	492	438	+54	9	Quarterfinals
3	Greece	5	3	2	402	416	−14	8	Quarterfinals
4	Brazil	5	2	3	498	494	+4	7	Quarterfinals
5	Puerto Rico	5	1	4	447	465	−18	6	9th place playoff
6	South Korea	5	0	5	422	562	−140	5	11th place playoff

Source: FIBA archive
Rules for classification: 1) points; 2) head-to-head points; 3) head-to-head goal average; 4) head-to-head number of points scored.

20 July 1996

Report

Greece	63–71	FR Yugoslavia
Scoring by half: 30–30, 33–41
Pts: Fasoulas 21; Rebs: Fasoulas 10; Asts: Sigalas 4		Pts: Savić 21; Rebs: Divac 8 Asts: Đorđević 6

Atlanta
Referees: Donald Cline (CAN), Carl Jungebrand (FIN)

22 July 1996

Report

Brazil	87–89	Greece
Scoring by half: 54–54, 33–35
Pts: Schmidt 32; Rebs: dos Santos 10; Asts: Minuci 6		Pts: Oikonomou 36; Rebs: Fasoulas 6 Asts: Bakatsias 5

Atlanta
Referees: Joseph Derosa (USA), Miguel Betancor Leon (ESP)

24 July 1996

Report

Greece	80–69	Puerto Rico
Scoring by half: 51–33, 29–36
Pts: Oikonomou 19; Rebs: Oikonomou 8 Asts: Oikonomou, Christodoulou 3		Pts: Mincy 20; Rebs: Mincy 8 Asts: Ortíz 4

Atlanta
Referees: Gennaro Colucci ITA, Raul Chaves Sagel (ARG)

26 July 1996

Report

South Korea	86–108	Greece
Scoring by half: 44–56, 42–52
Pts: J. Y. Hyun 24; Rebs: J. Y. Hyun 6 Asts: D. H. Kang 10		Pts: Sigalas 22; Rebs: Rentzias 8 Asts: Bakatsias, Sigalas 6

Atlanta
Referees: Romualdas Brazauskas (LTU), Yi Cui (CHN)

28 July 1996

Report

Australia	103–62	Greece
Scoring by half: 52–30, 51–32
Pts: Gaze 17; Rebs: Bradtke 8 Asts: Heal 5		Pts: Oikonomou 22; Rebs: Papanikolaou 6 Asts: Giannakis 4

Atlanta
Referees: Pascal Noel Dorizon (FRA), Jose Lapaix Guance (DOM)

Quarterfinals

30 July 1996
10:00

Report

Lithuania	99–66	Greece
Scoring by half: 45–19, 54–47
Pts: Marčiulionis 16; Rebs: Sabonis 11; Asts: Marčiulionis 7		Pts: Sigalas 18; Rebs: Rentzias 4 Asts: Sigalas 5

Atlanta
Referees: Miguel Betancor Leon (ESP), Raul Chaves Sagel (ARG)

5–8th Place classification match

1 August 1996
10:00

Report

China	75–115	Greece
Scoring by half: 24–50, 51–65
Pts: Wu 20; Rebs: Liu 8 Asts: Li 7		Pts: Fasoulas 19; Rebs: Christodoulou 12; Asts: Christodoulou 8

Atlanta
Referees: Joseph Derosa (USA), Tomislav Jovancic (YUG)

5th Place match

2 August 1996
22:00

Report

Greece	91–72	Brazil
Scoring by half: 45–49, 46–23
Pts: Sigalas 35; Rebs: Fasoulas, Christodoulou 7 Asts: Patavoukas 7		Pts: Minuci 23; Rebs: Vianna 11; Asts: Ratto 7

Atlanta
Referees: Roman Ryzhyk (UKR), Juan Figueroa (PUR)

== Boxing ==
Men's Bantamweight (– 54 kg)

- Agathagelos Tsiripidis
  1. First Round — Lost to Abdelaziz Boulehia (Algeria) on points (6-10)

Men's Featherweight (– 57 kg)

- Tigran Ouzlian
  1. First Round — Bye
  2. Second Round — Lost to Ramaz Paliani (Russia), 2-27

== Diving ==
Men's 3m Springboard

- Nikolaos Siranidis

- Preliminary Heat — 316.50 (→ did not advance, 26th place)

== Fencing ==
One female fencer represented Greece in 1996.

Women's épée

- Niki-Katerina Sidiropoulou

== Judo ==
Charalampos Papaioannou 7th place, heavy weight

== Sailing ==
Men

Athlete	Event	Race											Net points	Final rank
Athlete	Event	1	2	3	4	5	6	7	8	9	10	11	Net points	Final rank
Nikolaos Kaklamanakis	Mistral	5	1	2	6	1	~~9~~	1	1	~~DNF~~	—N/a		17	Gold medal
Aimilios Papathanasiou	Finn	26	21	~~DNF~~	27	~~PMS~~	16	21	23	29	DNF	—N/a	195	27
Andreas Kosmatopoulos; Konstantinos Trigkonis	470	11	~~19~~	18	13	5	2	15	18	5	10	~~24~~	97	11

Women

Athlete	Event	Race											Net points	Final rank
Athlete	Event	1	2	3	4	5	6	7	8	9	10	11	Net points	Final rank
Angeliki Skarlatou	Mistral	~~23~~	21	~~24~~	22	22	24	21	21	19	—N/a		149	23
Maria Mylona	Europe	13	22	20	22	~~24~~	13	11	11	19	21	~~24~~	152	22
Aikaterini Kaloudi; Emilia Tsoulfa	470	9	~~20~~	6	~~19~~	18	6	16	17	17	18	13	120	17

Open

Athlete	Event	Race											Net points	Final rank
Athlete	Event	1	2	3	4	5	6	7	8	9	10	11	Net points	Final rank
Dimitrios Theodorakis	Laser	21	28	16	18	~~33~~	26	28	20	~~25~~	25	24	203	27
Anastasios Bountouris; Dimitrios Boukis	Star	6	8	~~14~~	3	6	6	1	~~16~~	4	11	—N/a	45	4
Stavros Alevras; Panagiotis Alevras; Stefanos Chandakas	Soling	14	12	18	~~PMS~~	3	16	~~21~~	11	20	13	—N/a	107	18

== Swimming ==
Men's 50m Freestyle

- George Giziotis
  1. Heat – 23.56 (→ did not advance, 34th place)

Men's 100m Freestyle

- George Giziotis
  1. Heat – 52.04 (→ did not advance, 46th place)

Men's 200m Freestyle

- Dimitris Manganas
  1. Heat – 1:53.84 (→ did not advance, 30th place)

Men's 400m Freestyle

- Dimitris Manganas
  1. Heat – 3:54.85
  2. B-Final – 3:57.39 (→ did not advance, 16th place)

Men's 100m Backstroke

- Panagiotis Adamidis
  1. Heat – 58.12 (→ did not advance, 38th place)

Men's 100m Butterfly

- Georgios Popotas
  1. Heat – 56.16 (→ did not advance, 43rd place)

Men's 200m Butterfly

- Georgios Popotas
  1. Heat – 2:06.00 (→ did not advance, 40th place)

Women's 100m Freestyle

- Antonia Mahaira
  1. Heat – 57.92 (→ did not advance, 31st place)

Women's 200m Freestyle

- Antonia Mahaira
  1. Heat – 2:03.21
  2. B-Final – 2:03.19 (→ 14th place)

Women's 400m Freestyle

- Antonia Mahaira
  1. Heat – 4:24.05 (→ did not advance, 34th place)

Women's 100m Backstroke

- Katerina Klepkou
  1. Heat – 1:05.94 (→ did not advance, 27th place)

Women's 200m Backstroke

- Katerina Klepkou
  1. Heat – 2:22.83 (→ did not advance, 31st place)

Women's 100m Butterfly

- Marina Karystinou
  1. Heat – 1:05.05 (→ did not advance, 40th place)

Women's 200m Butterfly

- Marina Karystinou
  1. Heat – 2:20.57 (→ did not advance, 29th place)

Women's 200m Individual Medley

- Katerina Sarakatsani
  1. Heat – 2:19.74 (→ did not advance, 23rd place)

Women's 400m Individual Medley

- Katerina Sarakatsani
  1. Heat – 4:56.32 (→ did not advance, 25th place)

Women's 4 × 100 m Medley Relay

- Katerina Klepkou, Katerina Sarakatsani, Marina Karystinou, and Antonia Mahaira
  1. Heat – 4:24.80 (→ did not advance, 22nd place)

== Tennis ==
Women's Singles Competition

- Christina Papadáki
  1. First round — Lost to Angélica Gavaldón (Mexico) 1-6 6-3 2-6

== Water polo ==
=== Men's team competition ===
- Preliminary Round (Group B)

- Greece – Croatia 5-8
- Greece – United States 7-9
- Greece – Romania 8-5
- Greece – Italy 8-10
- Greece – Ukraine 9-6

- Quarter Finals

- Greece – Hungary 8-12

- Classification Matches

- 5th/8th place: Greece – United States 7-6
- 5th/6th place: Greece – Russia 8-10 (→ Sixth place)

- Team Roster

- George Mavrotas
- Anastasios Papanastasiou
- Filippos Kaiafas
- Evangelos Patras
- Gerasimos Voltirakis
- Theodoros Lorantos
- Konstantinos Loudis
- Georgios Afroudakis
- Thomas Khatzis
- Theodoros Khatzitheodorou
- Georgios Psykhos
- Simeon Georgaras
- Theodoros Kalakonas

== Weightlifting ==
Men's Light-Heavyweight (– 83 kg)

- Pyrros Dimas

- Final — 180.0 + 212.5 = 392.5 (→ Gold Medal)
