= Swimming at the 1996 Summer Olympics – Women's 4 × 100 metre medley relay =

Women's 4 × 100 m medley relay at the Games of the XXVI Olympiad
- Venue: Georgia Tech Aquatic Center
- Date: July 24, 1996 (heats & final)
- Competitors: 103 from 24 nations
- Teams: 24
- Winning time: 4:02.88

Medalists
1st place, gold medalist(s)		Beth Botsford, Amanda Beard, Angel Martino, Amy Van Dyken, Catherine Fox*, Whitney Hedgepeth*, Kristine Quance*, Jenny Thompson*	United States
2nd place, silver medalist(s)		Nicole Stevenson, Samantha Riley, Susie O'Neill, Sarah Ryan, Helen Denman*, Angela Kennedy*	Australia
3rd place, bronze medalist(s)		Chen Yan, Han Xue, Cai Huijue, Shan Ying; *Indicates the swimmer only competed in the preliminary heats.	China

The women's 4 × 100 metre medley relay event at the 1996 Summer Olympics took place on July 24, 1996, at the Georgia Tech Aquatic Center in Atlanta, United States.

== Records ==
Prior to this competition, the existing world and Olympic records were as follows.

World record	China (CHN); He Cihong (1:00.16); Dai Guohong (1:09.04); Liu Limin (58.66); Le Jingyi (53.81)	4:01.67	Rome, Italy	10 September 1994
Olympic record	United States; Lea Loveless (1:00.82); Anita Nall (1:08.67); Crissy Ahmann-Leighton (58.58); Jenny Thompson (54.47)	4:02.54	Barcelona, Spain	30 July 1992

== Results ==
=== Heats ===
Rule: The eight fastest teams advance to the final (Q).

Rank	Heat	Lane	Nation	Swimmers	Time	Notes
1	2	4	United States	Whitney Hedgepeth (1:01.45); Kristine Quance (1:10.40); Jenny Thompson (58.53); Catherine Fox (55.42)	4:05.80	Q
2	3	4	Australia	Nicole Stevenson (1:03.07); Helen Denman (1:09.62); Angela Kennedy (1:00.45); Sarah Ryan (55.73)	4:08.87	Q
3	3	3	Germany	Antje Buschschulte (1:02.83); Kathrin Dumitru (1:11.51); Franziska van Almsick (59.71); Sandra Völker (54.90)	4:08.95	Q
4	1	4	China	Chen Yan (1:02.88); Han Xue (1:11.28); Cai Huijue (59.78); Shan Ying (55.29)	4:09.23	Q
5	3	6	South Africa	Marianne Kriel (1:02.74); Penny Heyns (1:07.78); Mandy Loots (1:02.44); Helene Muller (56.51)	4:09.47	Q, AF
6	2	5	Canada	Julie Howard (1:04.01); Guylaine Cloutier (1:08.80); Sarah Evanetz (1:01.02); Shannon Shakespeare (55.67)	4:09.50	Q
7	3	2	Italy	Lorenza Vigarani (1:03.88); Manuela Dalla Valle (1:09.30); Ilaria Tocchini (1:01.03); Cecilia Vianini (56.36)	4:10.57	Q
8	1	5	Russia	Nina Zhivanevskaya (1:02.40); Yelena Makarova (1:10.89); Svetlana Pozdeyeva (1:00.90); Natalya Meshcheryakova (56.46)	4:10.65	Q
9	3	5	Japan	Mai Nakamura (1:02.95); Masami Tanaka (1:10.82); Ayari Aoyama (1:00.87); Suzu Chiba (56.07)	4:10.71	
10	2	3	Sweden	Therese Alshammar (1:03.80); Hanna Jaltner (1:10.06); Johanna Sjöberg (1:00.77); Louise Jöhncke (56.25)	4:10.88	
11	1	3	Hungary	Krisztina Egerszegi (1:01.05); Ágnes Kovács (1:09.83); Edit Klocker (1:03.18); Anna Nyíri (56.86)	4:10.92	
12	1	7	Netherlands	Brenda Starink (1:03.82); Madelon Baans (1:10.13); Wilma van Hofwegen (1:01.13); Karin Brienesse (56.56)	4:11.64	
13	2	6	Great Britain	Helen Slatter (1:03.87); Jaime King (1:11.15); Caroline Foot (1:01.75); Karen Pickering (56.98)	4:13.75	
14	1	2	Finland	Anu Koivisto (1:04.19); Mia Hagman (1:11.33); Marja Pärssinen (1:02.01); Minna Salmela (56.61)	4:14.14	NR
15	2	2	Spain	Eva Piñera (1:04.92); María Olay (1:12.65); María Peláez (1:01.38); Claudia Franco (56.68)	4:15.63	
16	1	6	France	Hélène Ricardo (1:04.10); Karine Brémond (1:11.93); Cécile Jeanson (1:02.73); Solenne Figuès (56.93)	4:15.69	
17	2	7	Romania	Cătălina Cășaru (1:05.06); Beatrice Câșlaru (1:12.31); Loredana Zisu (1:02.65); Luminiţa Dobrescu (56.16)	4:16.18	
18	2	1	South Korea	Lee Ji-hyun (1:04.55); Byun Hye-young (1:13.22); Park Woo-hee (1:04.48); Lee Bo-eun (56.73)	4:18.98	NR
19	3	7	New Zealand	Lydia Lipscombe (1:04.29); Anna Wilson (1:13.82); Anna Simcic (1:04.95); Alison Fitch (56.77)	4:19.83	
20	2	8	Czech Republic	Kateřina Pivoňková (1:05.76); Lenka Maňhalová (1:13.41); Marcela Kubalčíková (1:04.34); Kristýna Kyněrová (57.54 )	4:21.05	
21	3	1	Portugal	Maria Santos (1:05.70); Joana Soutinho (1:13.73); Ana Francisco (1:04.29); Ana Alegria (57.89)	4:21.61	
22	3	8	Greece	Aikaterini Klepkou (1:05.76); Aikaterini Sarakatsani (1:15.59); Marina Karystinou (1:05.42); Antonia Machaira (58.03)	4:24.80	
23	1	8	Argentina	Valeria Álvarez (1:05.69); María Carolina Santa Cruz (1:15.13); María del Pilar Pereyra (1:04.33); María Bertelloti (1:02.84)	4:27.99	
24	1	1	Chinese Taipei	Lin Chien-ju (1:10.67); Mou Ying-hsin (1:20.41); Hsieh Shu-ting (1:05.09); Tsai Shu-min (1:02.73)	4:38.90	

=== Final ===
Rank	Lane	Nation	Swimmers	Time	Notes
1st place, gold medalist(s)	4	United States	Beth Botsford (1:01.67); Amanda Beard (1:08.34); Angel Martino (58.70); Amy Van Dyken (54.17)	4:02.88	
2nd place, silver medalist(s)	5	Australia	Nicole Stevenson (1:02.65); Samantha Riley (1:08.19); Susie O'Neill (59.03); Sarah Ryan (55.21)	4:05.08	
3rd place, bronze medalist(s)	6	China	Chen Yan (1:02.48); Han Xue (1:09.92); Cai Huijue (59.92); Shan Ying (55.02)	4:07.34	
4	2	South Africa	Marianne Kriel (1:02.39); Penny Heyns (1:07.41); Mandy Loots (1:02.33); Helene Muller (56.03)	4:08.16	AF
5	7	Canada	Julie Howard (1:03.54); Guylaine Cloutier (1:08.79); Sarah Evanetz (1:00.85); Shannon Shakespeare (55.11)	4:08.29	
6	3	Germany	Antje Buschschulte (1:02.61); Kathrin Dumitru (1:11.68); Franziska van Almsick (1:00.42); Sandra Völker (54.51)	4:09.22	
7	8	Russia	Nina Zhivanevskaya (1:02.08); Yelena Makarova (1:11.76); Yelena Nazemnova (1:00.80); Natalya Meshcheryakova (55.92)	4:10.56	
8	1	Italy	Lorenza Vigarani (1:03.73); Manuela Dalla Valle (1:09.42); Ilaria Tocchini (1:01.01); Cecilia Vianini (56.43)	4:10.59	
