= P.A.O.K. =

Greek multi-sports club

P.A.O.K
- Π.Α.Ο.Κ.
- Full name: Πανθεσσαλονίκειος Αθλητικός Όμιλος Κωνσταντινουπολιτών
- Nickname: Dikefalos Aetos (Double-Headed Eagle); Asprόmavri (White-Blacks)
- Founded: 20 April 1926; 100 years ago
- Colours: Black, White
- Chairman: Nikolaos Paraskevopoulos
- Club titles: European Titles: 2 Balkan Titles: 1
- Website: acpaok.gr

P.A.O.K. (Greek: Π.Α.Ο.Κ., Πανθεσσαλονίκειος Αθλητικός Όμιλος Κωνσταντινουπολιτών, romanized: Panthessalonikeios Athlitikós Ómilos Constantinopoliton, lit. 'Pan-Thesalonian Athletic Club of Constantinopolitans')", commonly known as A.C. PAOK (Α.Σ. Π.Α.Ο.Κ.), is a major multi-sports club based in Thessaloniki, Macedonia, Greece. The club has several departments, including football, basketball, volleyball, handball, water polo, swimming, wrestling, ice hockey, and weightlifting. P.A.O.K was founded on 20 April 1926. Because of its crest, it is also known as the "Double-Headed Eagle of the North", in contrast with AEK, the "Double-Headed Eagle". They are one of the most popular Greek sports-clubs with many fans all over the country (mostly, but not exclusively, in Northern Greece), and also among the Greek diaspora.

== History ==
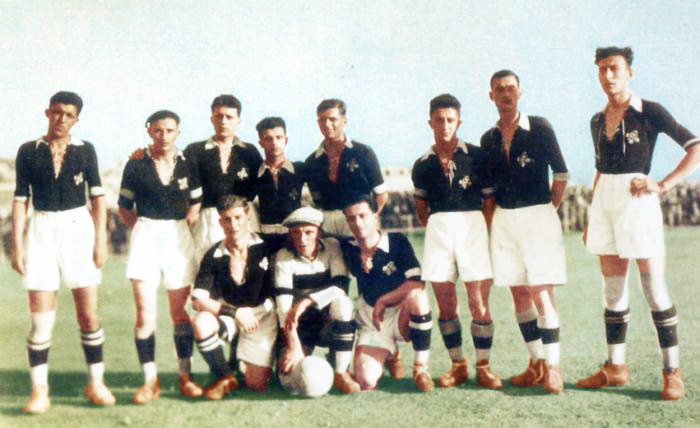
The football team of 1926

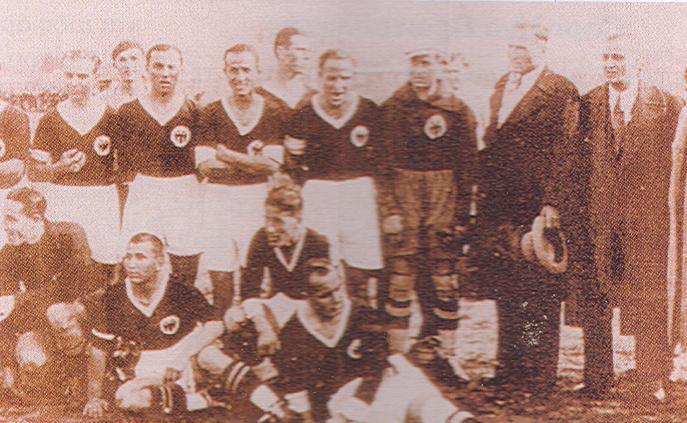
The team of 1939

PAOK is closely linked with Hermes Sports Club (Greek: Ερμής), which was formed in 1875 by the Greek community of Pera, a district of Constantinople (Istanbul). The club was founded on 20 April 1926 by Constantinopolitans who fled to Thessaloniki after the Greek defeat in the Greco-Turkish War (see Rum Millet).

The club's first memorandum of association signed on 30 March 1926 at Enosis Konstantinoupoliton Thessalonikis office, and was approved on 20 April 1926 by a decision of the Thessaloniki Court of First Instance (No. 822). The founding members were A. Angelopoulos, A. Athanasiadis, K. Anagnostidis, M. Ventourellis, F. Vyzantinos, V.Karapiperis, A. Dimitriadis, D. Dimitriadis, N. Zoumboulidis, M. Theodosiadis, T. Ioakimopoulos, P. Kalpaktsoglou, T. Kartsambekis, D. Koemtzopoulos, K. Koemtzopoulos, P. Kontopoulos, K. Kritikos, M. Konstantinidis, P. Maleskas, I. Nikolaidis, L. Papadopoulos, F. Samantzopoulos, T. Tsoulkas, M. Tsoulkas, S. Triantafyllidis and T. Triantafyllidis (who was also its first chairman).

P.A.O.K.'s first Board of Directors, serving between 1926 and 1927, consisted of:

- Triantafyllos Triantafyllidis (President)
- Pantelis Kalpaktsoglou (1st vice-president)
- Konstantinos Kritikos (General Secretary)
- Menelaos Tsoulkas (Special Secretary)
- Ioakim Ioakimopoulos (Treasurer)
- Alexandros Angelopoulos (Director of Football)
- Aristodimos Dimitriadis (Director of Sports)
- Panagiotis Maleskas (Consultant)
- Konstantinos Koemtzopoulos (Consultant)
- Michalis Theodosiadis (Consultant)

The club's policy was to be open to every citizen of Thessaloniki, leading to a minor rivalry with AEK Thessaloniki, the other Constantinopolitan team of the city, in which only refugees were allowed to play. The original logo of PAOK was a horseshoe and a four-leaf clover. The leaves were green and above them were the initials of the word PAOK. Kostas Koemtzopoulos, one of PAOK's founding members, came up with this idea, inspired by his favourite brand of cigarettes.

The football club played their first game (friendly) on 4 May 1926, at Thermaikos stadium, defeating Megas Alexandros Thessaloniki 2–1. The first coach of the club was Kostas Andreadis, who spent five years on the bench without demanding any payment. Their first captain was Michalis Ventourelis.

The first professional contract was signed by the club on 5 September 1928. The contract stipulated that the French footballer Raymond Etienne – of Jewish descent from Pera Club – would be paid 4,000 drachmas per month. The contract was signed by Dr. Meletiou, the PAOK chairman, and Mr. Sakellaropoulos, the Hon. Secretary.

In early 1929, AEK Thessaloniki was virtually dissolved and absorbed by PAOK. PAOK thereupon changed their emblem, adopting the double-headed eagle, as a symbol of the club's Byzantine/Constantinopolitan heritage. PAOK also got possession of AEK's facilities located around Syntrivani (i.e. Fountain) Square.

In 1937, PAOK won his first title, the Macedonia (EPSM or Thessaloniki) Championship, and participated in the Panhellenic Championship, finishing second. The 1937 team included: Sotiriadis, Vatikis, Goulios, Kontopoulos, Bostantzoglou, Panidis, Glaros, Kritas, Ioannidis, Kalogiannis, Koukoulas, Kosmidis, Apostolou, Vafiadis, Vasiliadis, Anastasiadis, Moschidis, Tzakatzoglou, Zakapidas.

The first Greek championship for the basketball team was achieved in 1958–59 season. The first Greek championship for the football team was achieved in 1975–76 season.

In the 90s, the basketball team won another Greek championship and two European cups, the 1990–91 FIBA European Cup Winners' Cup and the 1993–94 FIBA Korać Cup.

== Crest and Colours ==
The original logo of PAOK was a horseshoe and a four-leaf clover. The current symbol since 1929 is the double-headed eagle. The eagle symbolizes the origins of the club in the former Byzantine capital, Constantinople, and the legacy of the Greek refugees from Asia Minor, Eastern Thrace, Pontus and Caucasus. In 2013, a golden outline was added to the football team's crest, as a symbol of the club's Byzantine heritage.

The club's traditional colours are black, as sadness for the Asia Minor Catastrophe of 1922 and the end of the Greek presence in Anatolia, and white as hope for recovery.

== Supporters ==
P.A.O.K. is the most widely supported sports-club in Northern Greece and one of the 4 most popular in the country (along with the big-three of capital Athens and Piraeus). PAOK's traditional fanbase comes from the city of Thessaloniki, where the club is based, as well as from the rest of Macedonia region and Northern Greece. They also have fans all over the country and in the Greek Diaspora (Germany, Australia, USA, etc.).

== Rivalries ==
P.A.O.K.'s main rivals are Olympiacos, Aris (local rivals), Panathinaikos, AEK, Iraklis.

Football kit evolution

First

1926–27	1936–37	1962–63	1966–67	1967–68	1970–71	1971–72	1975–76	1984–85	1990–91

2002–03	2004–05	2008–09	2015–16	2016–17	2017–18	2018–19

Alternative

2000–01	2001–02	2013–14	2014–15	2015–16	2016–17	2017–18	2018–19

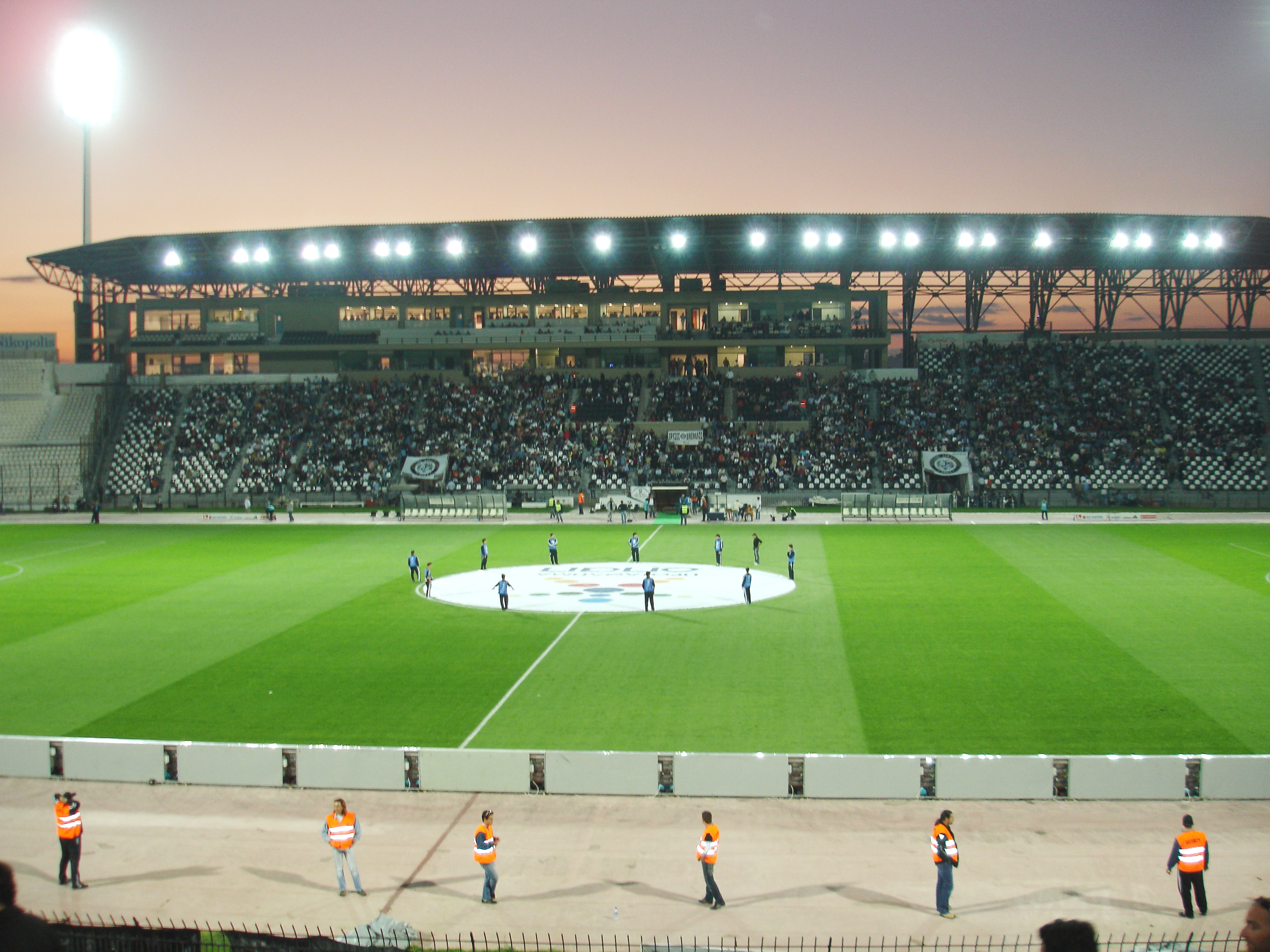
Toumba Stadium

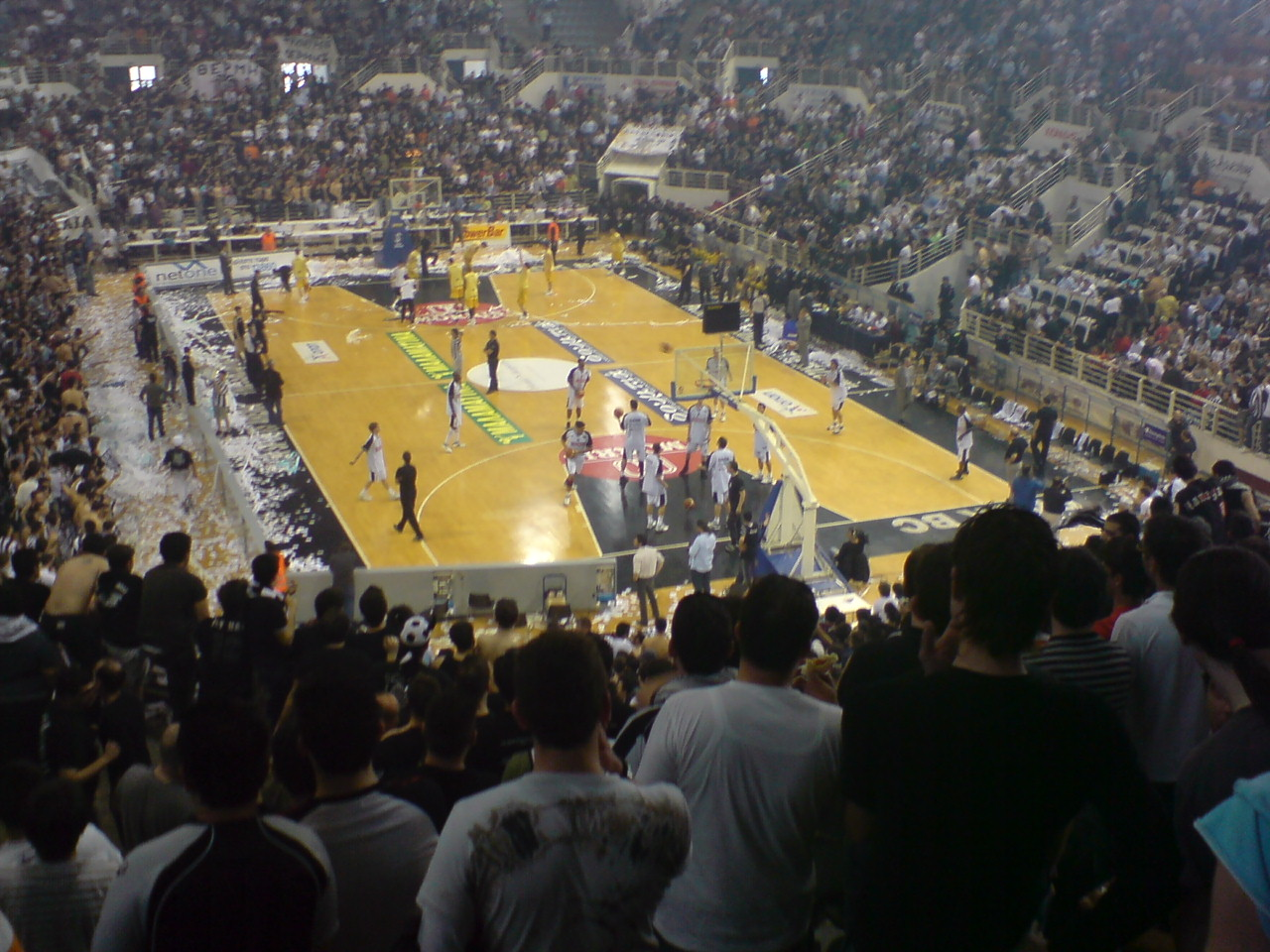
P.A.O.K. Sports Arena, home ground of basketball and volleyball teams

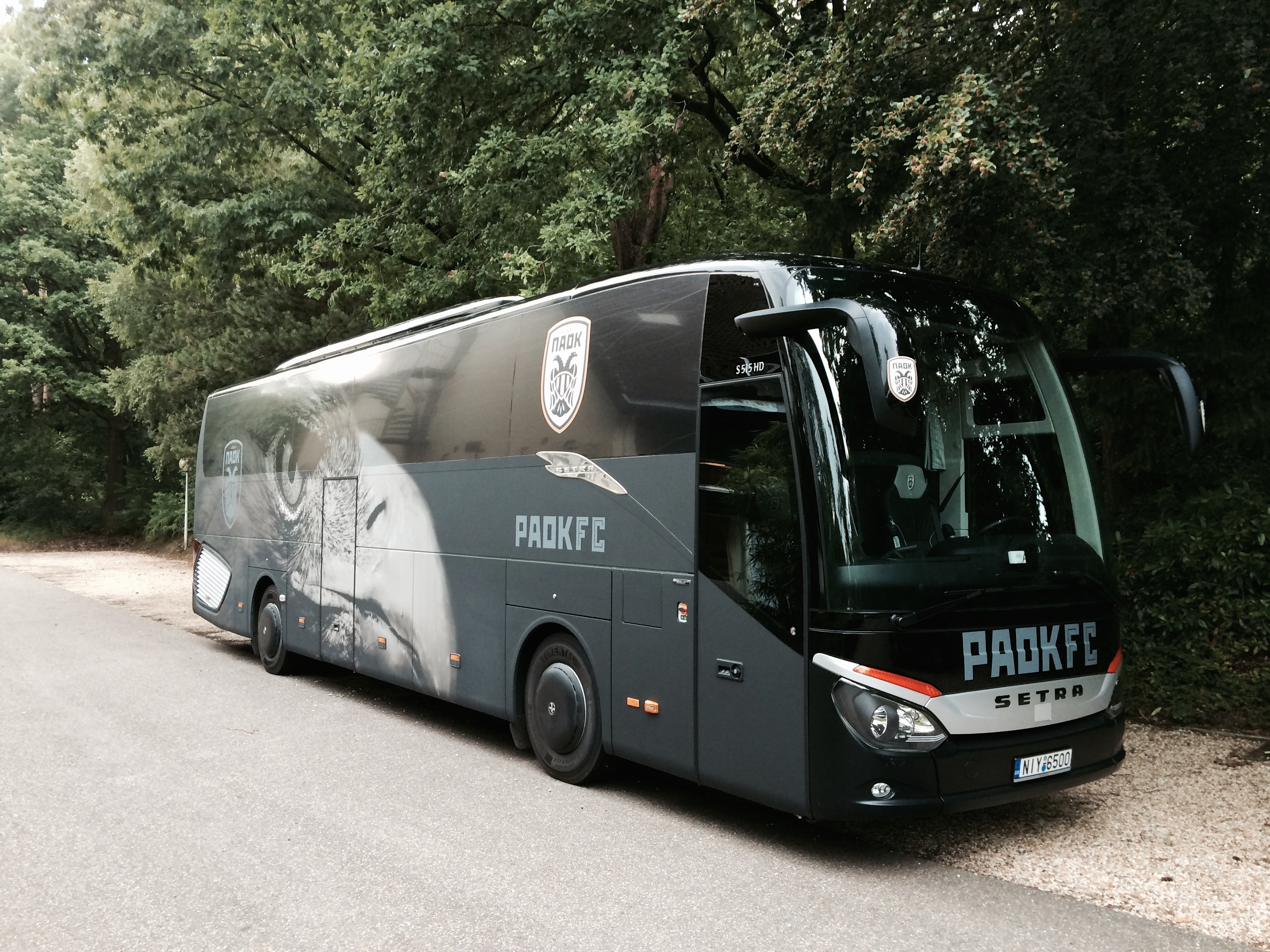
Bus of the team

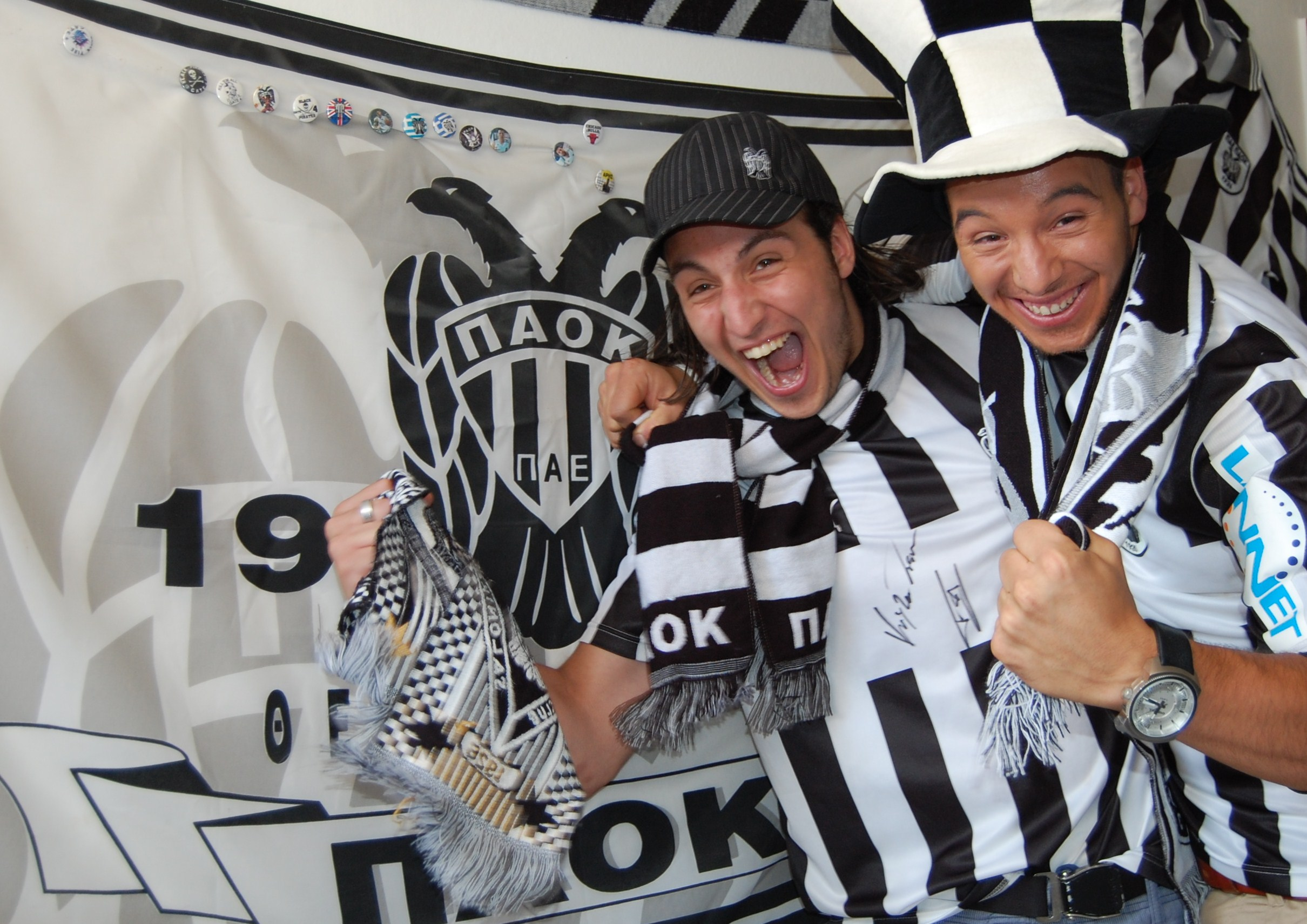
PAOK fans

== P.A.O.K. Departments – Honours ==
=== Football ===
==== Men's Football ====
- Greek Championship: 4
  - 1976, 1985, 2019, 2024
- Greek Cup: 8
  - 1972, 1974, 2001, 2003, 2017, 2018, 2019, 2021
- Greater Greece Cup: 1 (defunct)
  - 1973
- OPAP Summer League: 2 (defunct)
  - 1969, 1974

==== Women's Football ====
- Greek Championship: 20 (record)
  - 2002, 2006, 2007, 2008, 2009, 2010, 2011, 2012, 2013, 2015, 2016, 2017, 2018, 2019, 2020, 2021, 2022, 2023, 2024, 2026
- Greek Cup: 8 (record)
  - 2002, 2013, 2014, 2015, 2016, 2017, 2024, 2026

=== Basketball ===
==== Men's Basketball ====
- Greek Championship: 2
  - 1959, 1992
- Greek Cup: 3
  - 1984, 1995, 1999
- FIBA European Cup Winners' Cup: 1
  - 1991
- FIBA Korać Cup: 1
  - 1994

=== Volleyball ===
==== Men's Volleyball ====
- Greek Championship: 3
  - 2015, 2016, 2017
- Greek Cup: 5
  - 2015, 2018, 2019, 2022, 2023
- Greek Super Cup: 1
  - 2023

==== Women's Volleyball ====
- Greek Cup: 1
  - 2021

=== Handball ===
==== Men's Handball ====
- Greek Championship: 3
  - 2009, 2010, 2015
- Greek Cup: 4
  - 2012, 2015, 2017, 2024

==== Women's Handball ====
- Greek Championship: 7
  - 2013, 2019, 2020, 2021, 2022, 2023, 2026
- Greek Cup: 8
  - 2014, 2016, 2019, 2020, 2021, 2022, 2024, 2026
- Greek Super Cup: 2
  - 2023, 2026

==== Men's Beach Handball ====
- Greek Championship: 1
  - 2001

=== Weightlifting ===
- 7 Greek men's Championships: 2006, 2017, 2019, 2021, 2022, 2024, 2025

=== Wrestling ===
- 10 Greek men's Championships Greco-Roman: 2017, 2018, 2019, 2020, 2021, 2022, 2023, 2024, 2025, 2026

=== Judo ===
- 2 Greek men's Championships: 2019, 2021
- 2 Greek women's Championships: 2019, 2022
- 1 Greek mixed team Championships: 2023

=== Athletics ===
- 3 Greek women's Open Athletics Championships: 1976, 1977, 1982
- 2 Greek women's Cross Country Championships: 1968, 1974

=== Swimming ===
- 1 Greek OPEN Championship: 1987

=== Cycling ===
- 1 Greek men's Championship Mountain Bike: 2002

=== Boxing ===
- 2 Greek men's Championships: 2003, 2007

=== Roller hockey ===
- 1 Greek men's Championship: 2008
- 1 Balkan Amateur Hockey League: 2007

== European honours ==
Season	Men's Football	Men's basketball	Women's volleyball	Men's ice hockey
1973–74	UEFA Cup Winners' Cup; Quarter-finals			
1989–90		FIBA European Cup Winners' Cup; Semi-finals		
1990–91		FIBA European Cup Winners' Cup; Winners		
1991–92		FIBA European Cup; Final		
1992–93		FIBA European League; 3rd place		
1993–94		FIBA Korać Cup; Winners		
1995–96		FIBA European Cup; Final		
2006–07				Balkan Amateur Hockey League; Winners
2021–22	UEFA Conference League; Quarter-finals			
2023–24	UEFA Conference League; Quarter-finals			
2024–25		FIBA Europe Cup; Final	BVA Cup; Final	
2025–26		FIBA Europe Cup; Final		

== Notable former athletes ==
- Football: Men: Giorgos Koudas, Stavros Sarafis, Konstantinos Iosifidis, Christos Terzanidis, Angelos Anastasiadis, Georgios Skartados, Georgios Kostikos, Theodoros Zagorakis, Zisis Vryzas, Georgios Georgiadis, Pablo Gabriel García, Lino, Sérgio Conceição, Vieirinha, Dimitar Berbatov, Aleksandar Prijović, Lucas Pérez, Magdy Tolba, Hossam Hassan, Percy Olivares, Dimitris Paridis, Giannis Gounaris, Filotas Pellios, Neto Guerino, Ioannis Damanakis, Nikos Alavantas, Christos Dimopoulos, Giorgos Toursounidis, Kostas Frantzeskos, Omari Tetradze, Pantelis Kafes, Stelios Venetidis, Ioannis Okkas, Omar El Kaddouri, Panagiotis Engomitis, Pablo Contreras, Zlatan Muslimović, Dimitrios Salpingidis, José Ángel Crespo, Léo Matos, Yevhen Shakhov (footballer, born 1990), Diego Biseswar, Stefanos Athanasiadis, Dimitrios Pelkas, Maurício (footballer, born October 1988), Fernando Varela
- Women: Natalia Chatzigiannidou, Jelena Dimitrijević, Dimitra Panteliadou
- Basketball: Men: Bane Prelević, John Korfas, Peja Stojaković, Scott Skiles, Walter Berry, Ken Barlow, Cliff Levingston, Nikos Boudouris, Giorgos Balogiannis, Efthimios Rentzias, Giannis Giannoulis, Kostas Vasileiadis, Zoran Savić, Anthony Bonner, Frankie King, Claudio Coldebella, Manthos Katsoulis, Nikos Stavropoulos, Vangelis Alexandris, Panagiotis Fasoulas, Rasho Nesterovic, İbrahim Kutluay, Damir Mulaomerović, Dejan Tomašević
- Volleyball: Men: Dante Amaral, Ernardo Gómez, Alexander Shafranovich, Rolando Cepeda, Javier Jiménez, David Lee, Giannis Pantakidis, Giannis Kalmazidis, Vasileios Kournetas, Vladimir Grbić, Kevin Hansen, Matti Hietanen, Plamen Konstantinov, Paul Lotman, Olli-Pekka Ojansivu, Evan Patak, Vlado Petković, Konstantinos Prousalis, Clayton Stanley, Riley Salmon, Nikolaos Smaragdis, Saša Starović, Mitar Tzourits, Nikolay Uchikov, Ronald Zoodsma
- Athletics: Men: Michalis Akritidis, Themistoklis Akritidis, Dimitrios Kokotis, Konstantinos Koukodimos, Dimitrios Koutsoukis Women: Vasiliki Anastasiou, Xanthipi Koukoumaka, Voula Patoulidou
- Swimming: Men: Christos Papadopoulos Women: Kalliopi Araouzou, Antonia Machaira, Aikaterini Sarakatsani, Katerina Stikoudi, Aikaterini Klepkou, Anna Ntountounaki.

== Presidential History ==
Year	President
1926–1927	(Greece) Triantafyllos Triantafyllidis
1927–1928	(Greece) Vyzantios Fanourios
1928–1929	(Greece) Konstantinos Meletiou
1929–1930	(Greece) Athinodoros Athinodorou
1930–1931	(Greece) Pantelis Kalpaktsoglou
1931–1933	(Greece) Petros Levantis
1933–1935	(Greece) Savvas Tsantas
1935–1936	(Greece) Filaretos Tsompektsoglou
1936–1938	(Greece) Savvas Tsantas
1938–1939	(Greece) Ioannis Tsakiroglou
1939–1940	(Greece) Dimitrios Kamaras
1940–1944	(Greece) Pantelis Kalpaktsoglou
1944–1946	(Greece) Filaretos Tsompektsoglou
1946–1948	(Greece) Pantelis Kalpaktsoglou
1948–1949	(Greece) Mirodis Dimitrakopoulos
1949–1963	(Greece) Georgios Charalampidis
1963–1964	(Greece) Ippokratis Iordanoglou
1964–1966	(Greece) Dimitrios Dimadis

Year	President
1966–1969	(Greece) Vassilios Zervas
1969	(Greece) Evangelos Mylonas
1969–1971	(Greece) Stavros Georgiadis
1971–1972	(Greece) Ioannis Arvanitakis
1972–1973	(Greece) Stavros Simitzis
1973–1974	(Greece) Ioannis Arvanitakis
1974	(Greece) Georgios Zografos
1974–1975	(Greece) Arthouros Merdikian
1975–1981	(Greece) Georgios Pantelakis
1981–1983	(Greece) Ioannis Vranialis
1983–1984	(Greece) Dimosthenis Fintanidis
1984–1993	(Greece) Nikolaos Vezyrtzis
1993–1995	(Greece) Apostolos Oikonomidis
1995–1997	(Greece) Charis Lazaridis (Greece) Apostolos Alexopoulos
1997–1998	(Greece) Apostolos Alexopoulos
1998–2025	(Greece) Athanasios Katsaris
2025–2026	(Greece) Alkiviadis Isaiadis
2026–	(Greece) Nikolaos Paraskevopoulos

=== PAOK FC Presidential History ===
From the organization of the 1979–80 Alpha Ethniki Greece Football Clubs Association became professional, as based on a bill submitted on January 19, 1979 (Law 879/1979) the Greece Football Clubs Association (FCA) department of the club PAOK FC was converted into a Football Anonyme Company A.E

Period	Name
1979–1984	(Greece) Giorgos Pantelakis
1984–1986	(Greece) Petros Kalafatis
1986–1988	(Greece) Charis Savvidis
1988–1989	(Greece) Ioannis Dedeoglou
1989–1990	(Greece) Thomas Voulinos
1990	(Greece) Apostolos Alexopoulos
1990–1996	(Greece) Thomas Voulinos
1996	(Greece) Georgios Kalyvas
1996–1998	(Greece) Georgios Batatoudis
1998	(Greece) Petros Kalafatis
1998–2001	(Greece) Georgios Batatoudis
2001–2003	(Greece) Petros Kalafatis
2003–2004	(Greece) Ioannis Goumenos
2004	(Greece) Vasilios Pagonis
2004-2006	(Greece) Ioannis Goumenos
2006–2007	(Greece) Nikos Vezyrtzis
2007–2010	(Greece) Theodoros Zagorakis
2010–2014	(Greece) Zisis Vryzas
2014–2016	(Cyprus) Iakovos Aggelidis
2016	(Slovakia) Ľuboš Micheľ
2016–	(Greece) (Russia) Ivan Savvidis

=== PAOK B.C. Presidential History ===
Since 1928, the president of A.C. PAOK was responsible for the management of the Basketball department of PAOK. In 1992 the department became professional, with its own president.

Year	President
1992–1993	(Greece) Nikolaos Vezyrtzis
1993–1995	(Greece) Apostolos Oikonomidis
1995–1999	(Greece) Apostolos Alexopoulos
1999–2000	(Greece) Aristeidis Kanavis (Greece) Athanasios Akrivopoulos
2000–2002	(Greece) Vasilios Oikonomidis
2002–2004	(Greece) Athanasios Katsaris
2004–2008	(Greece) Dimitrios Paneloudis
2008–2009	(Greece) Dimitrios Drosos
2009–2011	(Greece) Miltiadis Kanotas
2011–2019	(Serbia) (Greece) Branislav Prelević
2019–2021	(Greece) Aristeidis Karakousis
2021–2025	(Greece) Thanasis Hatzopoulos
2025–Present	(Greece) Nikolaos Vezyrtzis

== Notable supporters ==
- Effie Achtsioglou, politician
- Stefanos Athanasiadis, footballer, former PAOK captain
- Angelos Anastasiadis, former football player and coach
- Georgios Aftias, journalist, politician
- Giannis Aggelakas, musician
- Anna Korakaki, shooter
- Elena Asimakopoulou, actor
- Iordanis Chasapopoulos, journalist
- Vicky Chatzivasileiou, journalist, TV presenter
- Sissy Christidou, TV presenter
- Rallia Christidou, singer, politician
- Makis Christodoulopoulos, singer
- Olympia Chopsonidou, model
- Demy, singer
- Georgios Donis, football player and coach
- Pyrros Dimas, Olympic champion, politician
- Stratos Dionysiou, singer
- Konstadinos Gatsioudis, Greek javelin thrower
- Periklis Iakovakis, athlete, European champion
- Michalis Iatropoulos, actor
- Antonis Kanakis, journalist
- Vasilis Karras, singer
- Stavros Kalafatis, former MP
- Charis Kastanidis, former MP with PASOK
- Nikos Kourkoulis, singer
- Eva Kaili, journalist, politician
- Georgios Koudas, footballer, former PAOK captain
- Razvan Lucescu, Romanian former football player and coach
- Manos Loizos, composer
- Kostas Makedonas, singer
- Sokratis Malamas, singer
- Manolis Mitsias, singer
- Giorgos Minos, sports journalist
- Alkinoos Ioannidis, singer
- Ioanna Lilly, former model
- Nikos Oikonomou, basketball player
- Marinos Ouzounidis, football player and coach
- Kyriakos Papadopoulos, footballer
- Nikos Papazoglou, singer
- Paola, singer
- Elena Rapti, politician
- Branislav Prelevic, Serbian basketball player and coach, former PAOK president and Greek champion
- Dimitris Salpingidis, football player and coach, former PAOK captain
- Dionysis Savvopoulos, musician
- Euclid Tsakalotos, former Minister of Economy
- Akis Tsochatzopoulos, Former Minister of National Defence of Greece
- Popi Tsapanidou, journalist
- Giorgos Toursounidis, football player and coach, former PAOK captain
- Natassa Theodoridou, singer
- Rania Thraskia, journalist, politician
- Tasos Telloglou, journalist
- Fay Skorda, TV presenter
- Gerasimos Skiadaresis, actor
- Katerina Stikoudi, actress, model, singer
- Sofoklis Schortsanitis, basketball player, 2006 FIBA Silver Medalist, former PAOK player
- Stavros Sarafis, footballer, former PAOK player
- Kyriakos Velopoulos, politician
- Nikos Vertis, singer
- Evangelos Venizelos, politician
- Zisis Vryzas, footballer, Euro 2004 champion, former PAOK player and president
- Kostas Vasileiadis, basketball player
- Loukas Vyntra, football player
- Theodoros Zagorakis, footballer, Euro 2004 champion, politician, former PAOK president
- Christos Zabounis, journalist
- Dimitris Lyacos, author
- Kostas Zouraris, author, former MP

== Gallery ==
Football

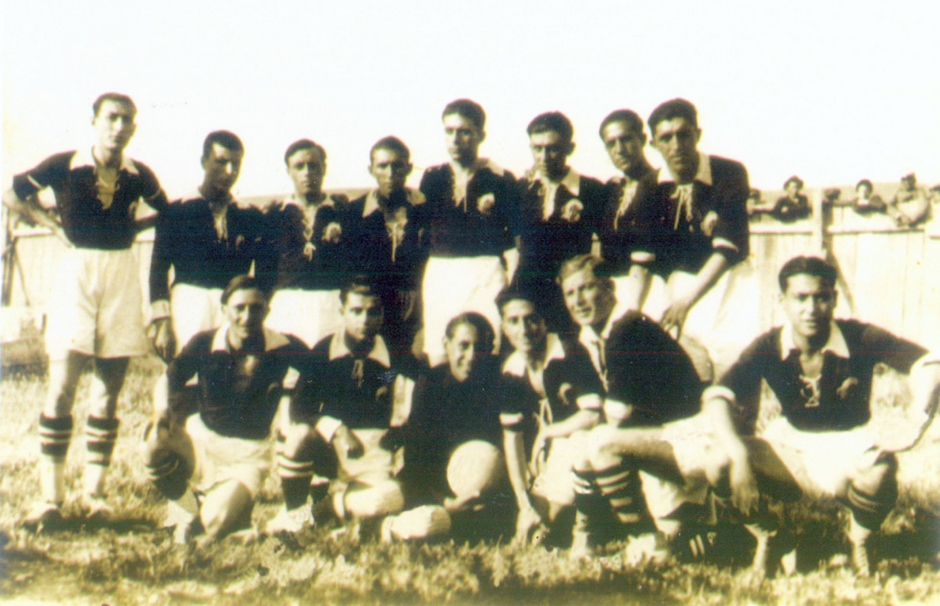
The team of 1928–29

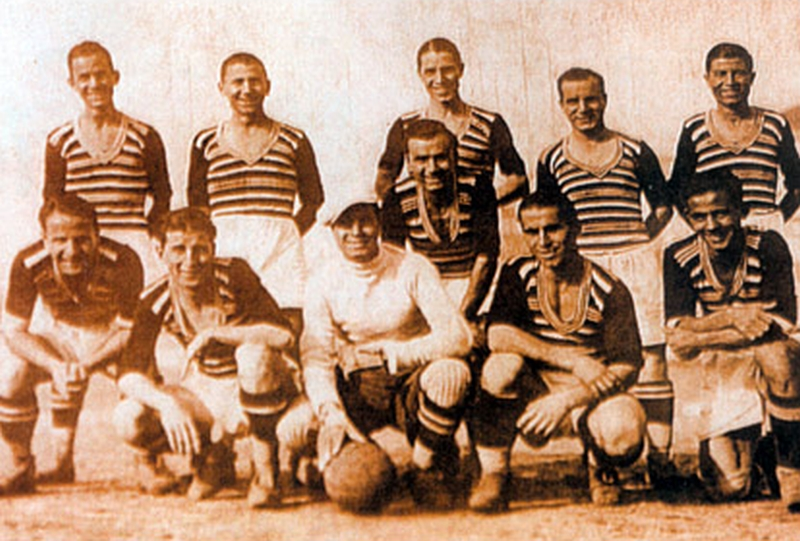
The team of 1936–37

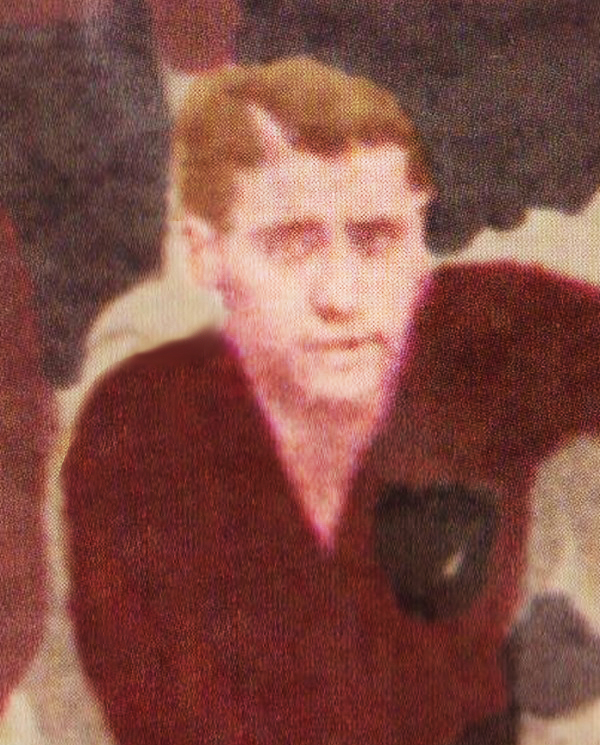
Raymond Étienne, the first foreign player of the club

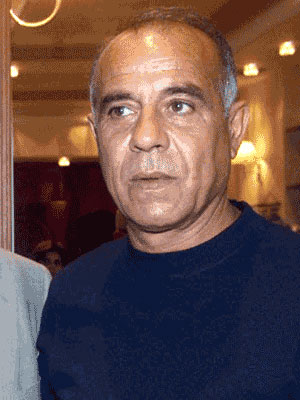
Giorgos Koudas

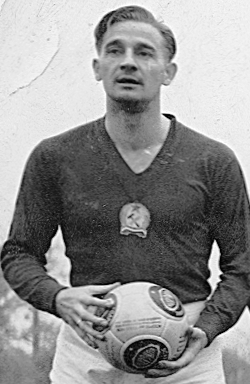
Gyula Lóránt, coach of the 1976 champion team

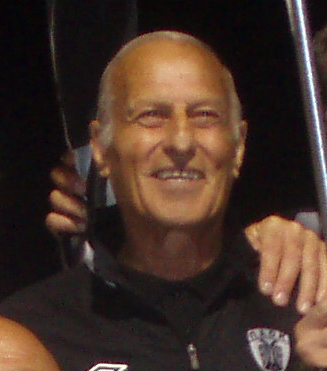
Christos Terzanidis

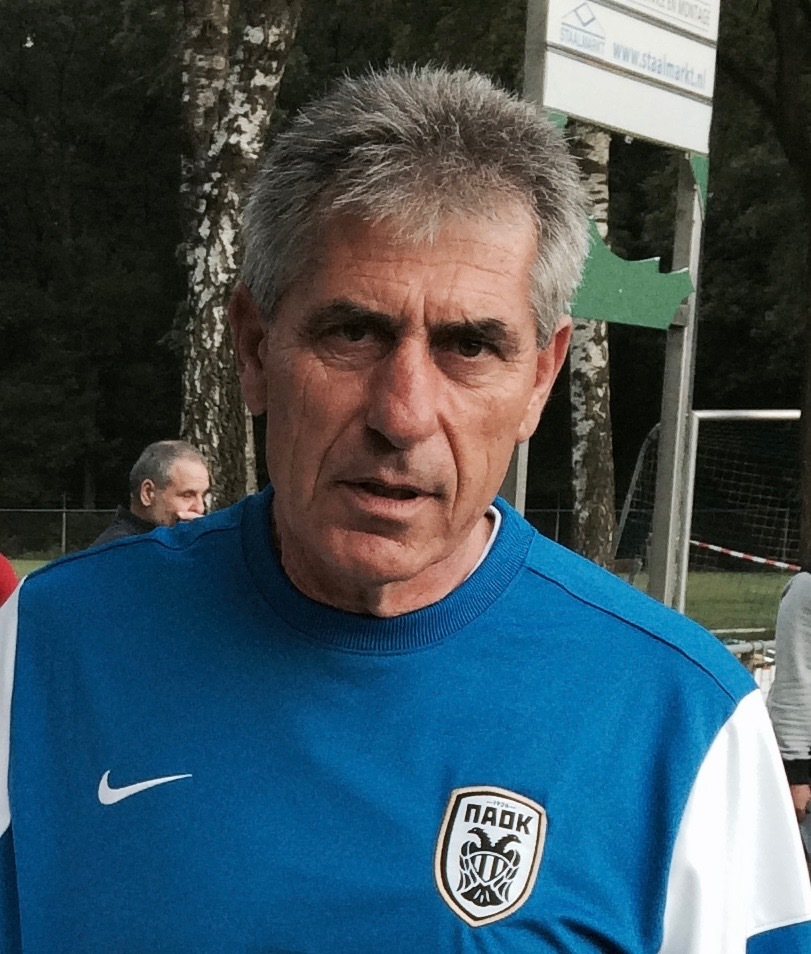
Player and later coach Angelos Anastasiadis

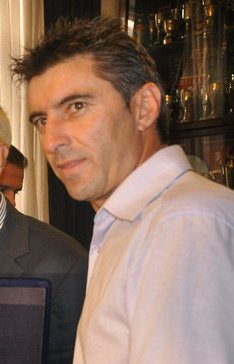
Theodoros Zagorakis, the iconic captain and later president of PAOK FC

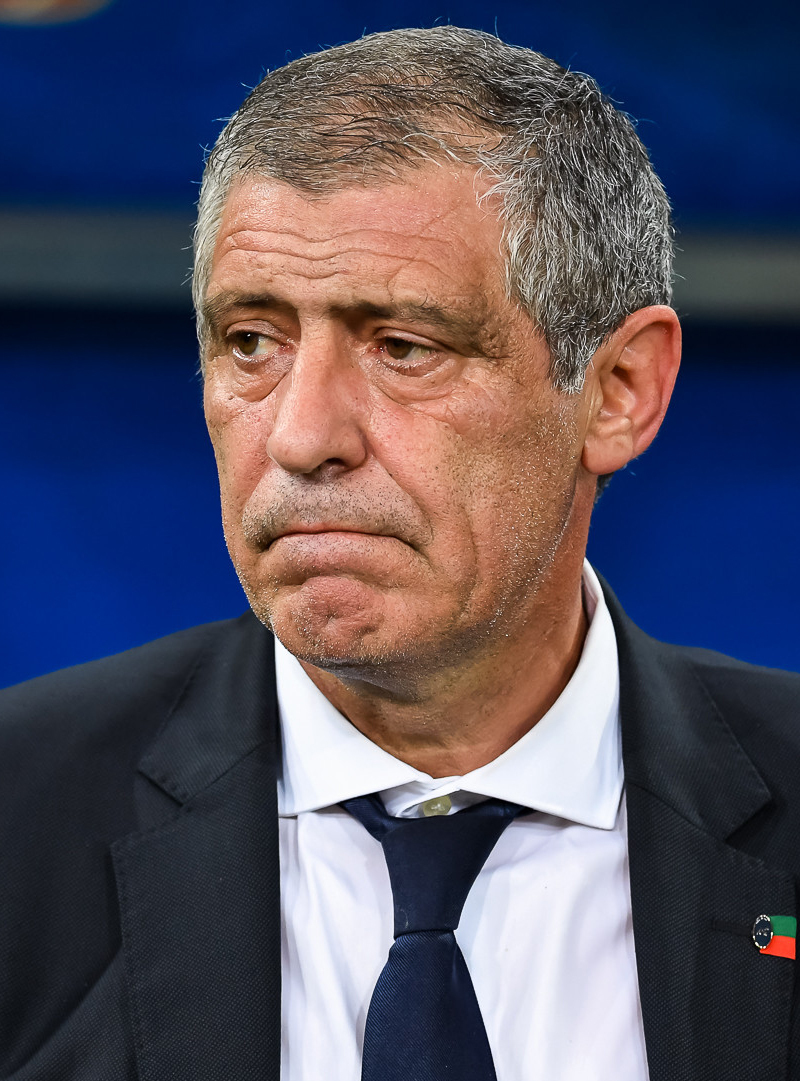
Fernando Santos

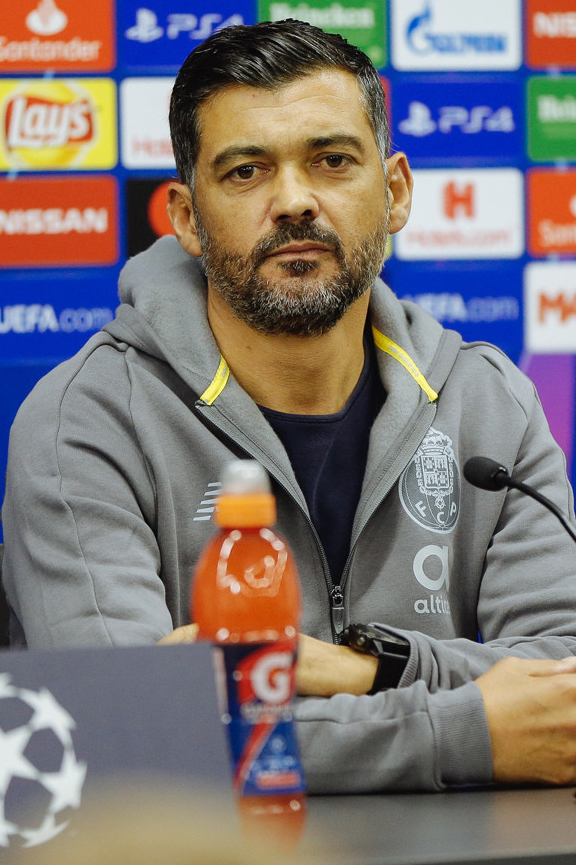
Sérgio Conceição

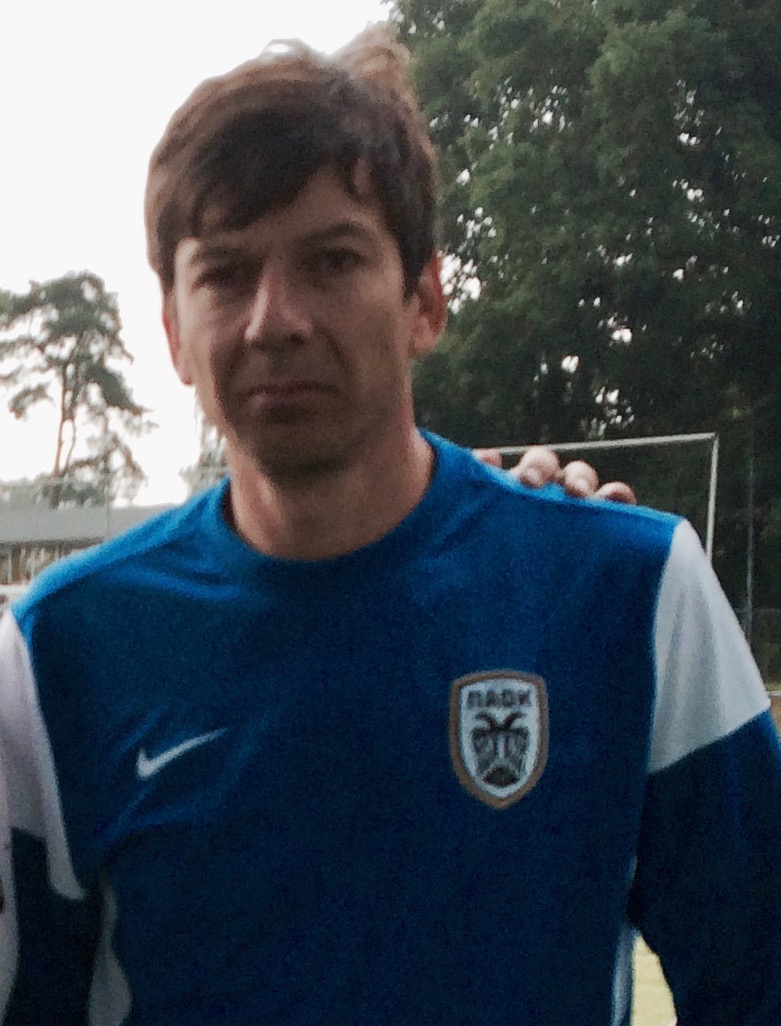
Pablo Gabriel García, one of the most popular players ever played for PAOK FC

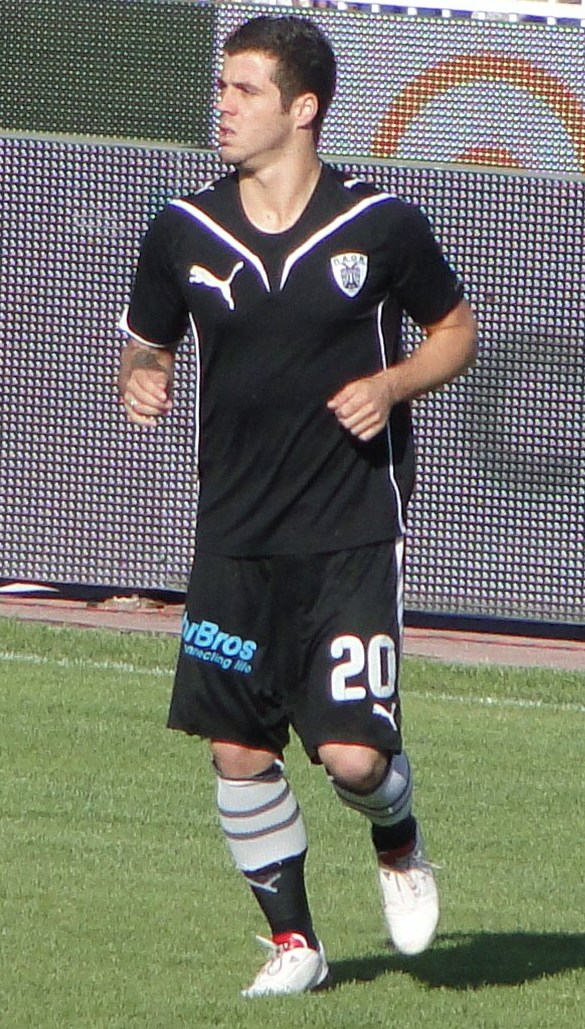
Captain Vieirinha

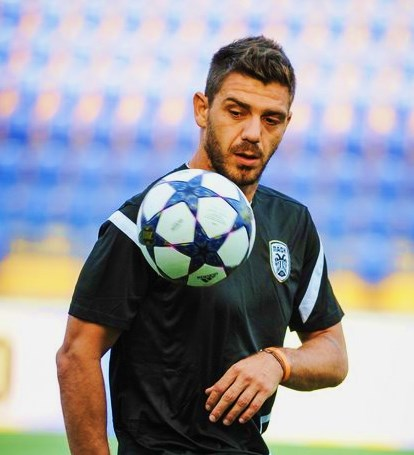
Kostas Katsouranis

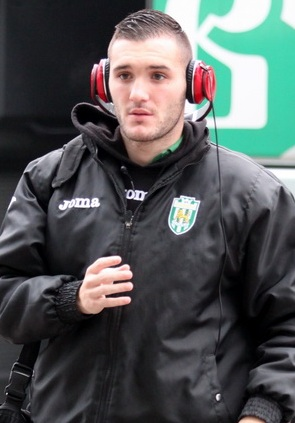
Lucas Pérez

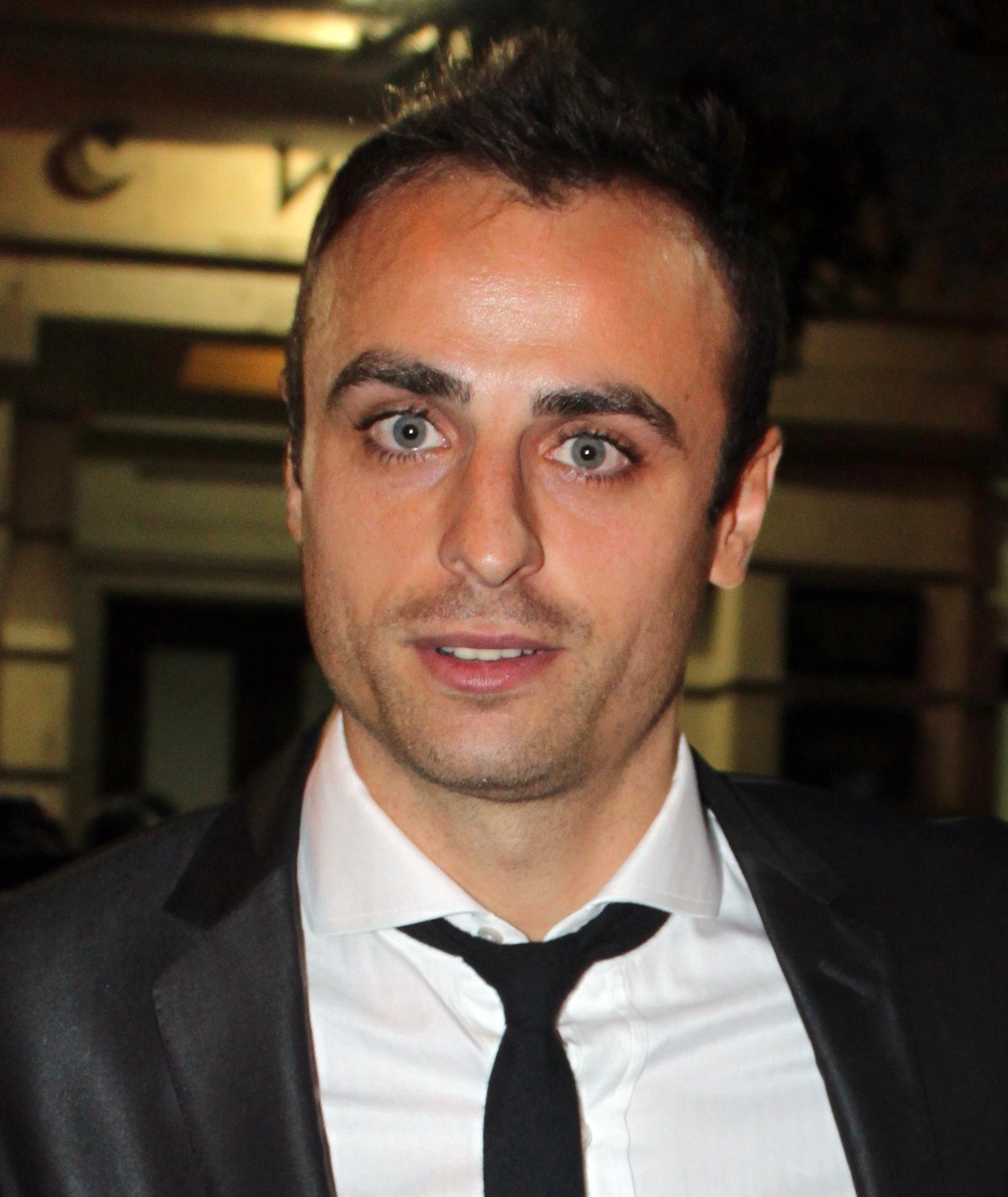
Dimitar Berbatov

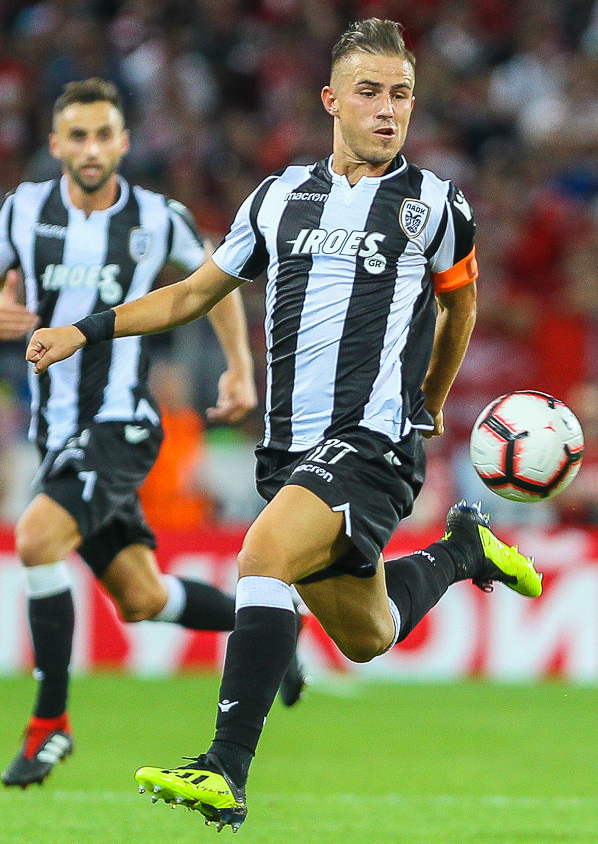
Dimitrios Pelkas

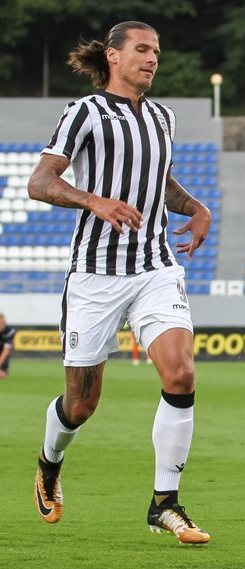
Aleksandar Prijović, top scorer during the 2017–18 season

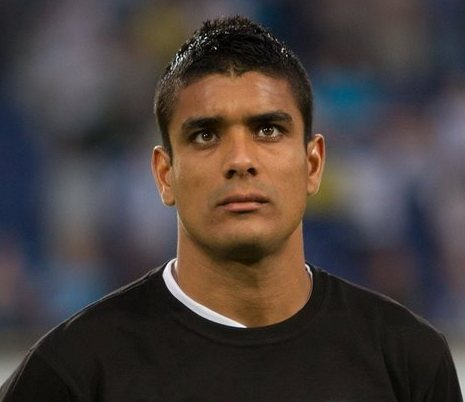
Léo Matos

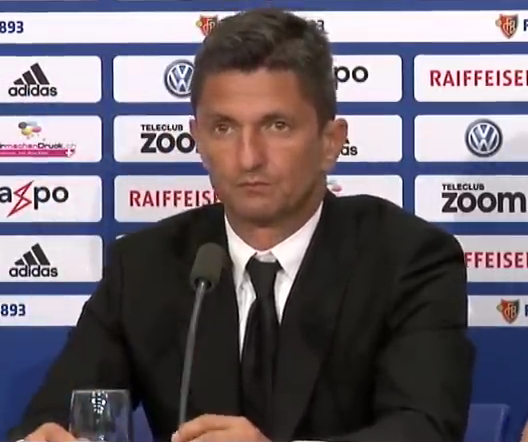
Razvan Lucescu

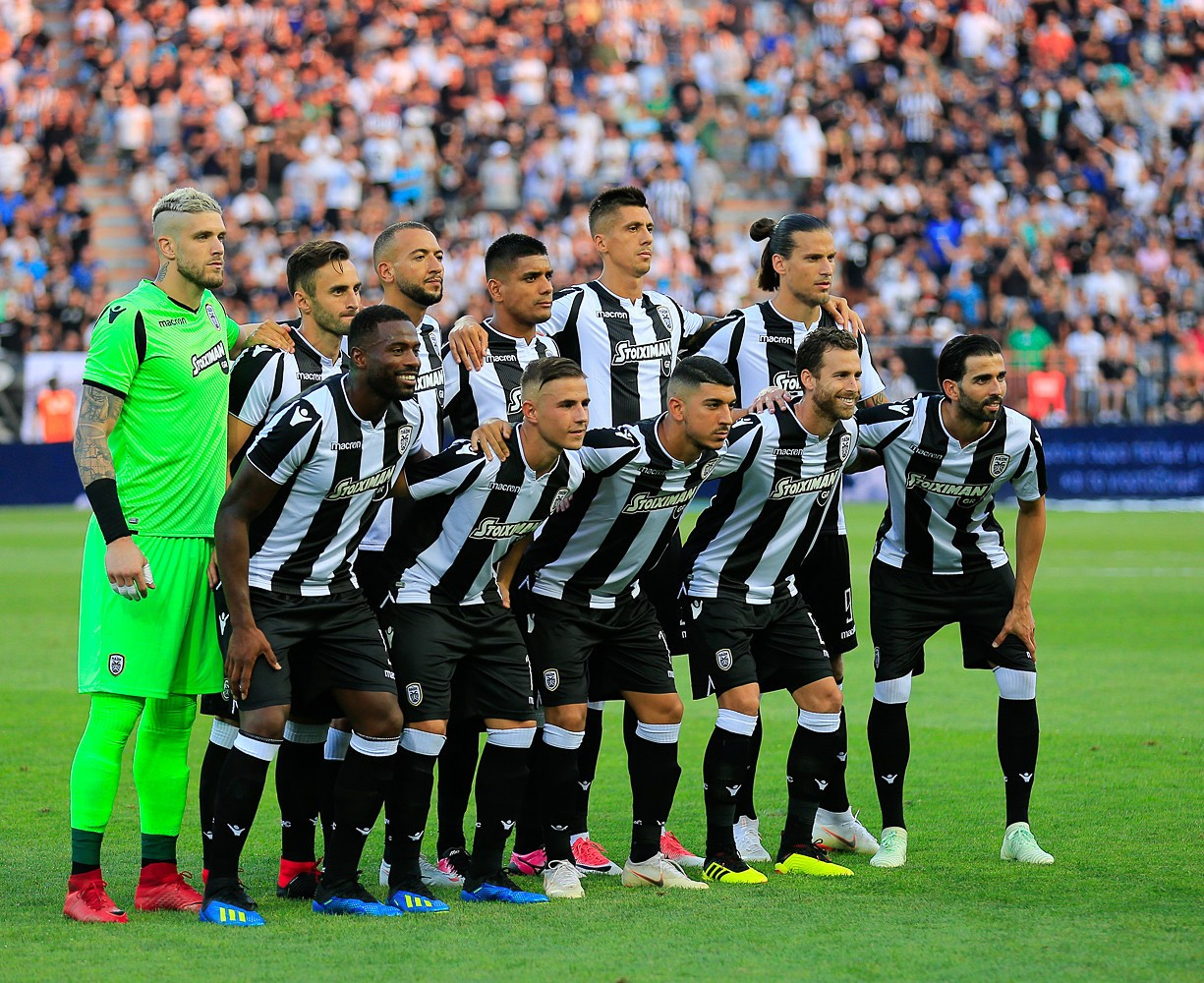
The team in 2018
Basketball

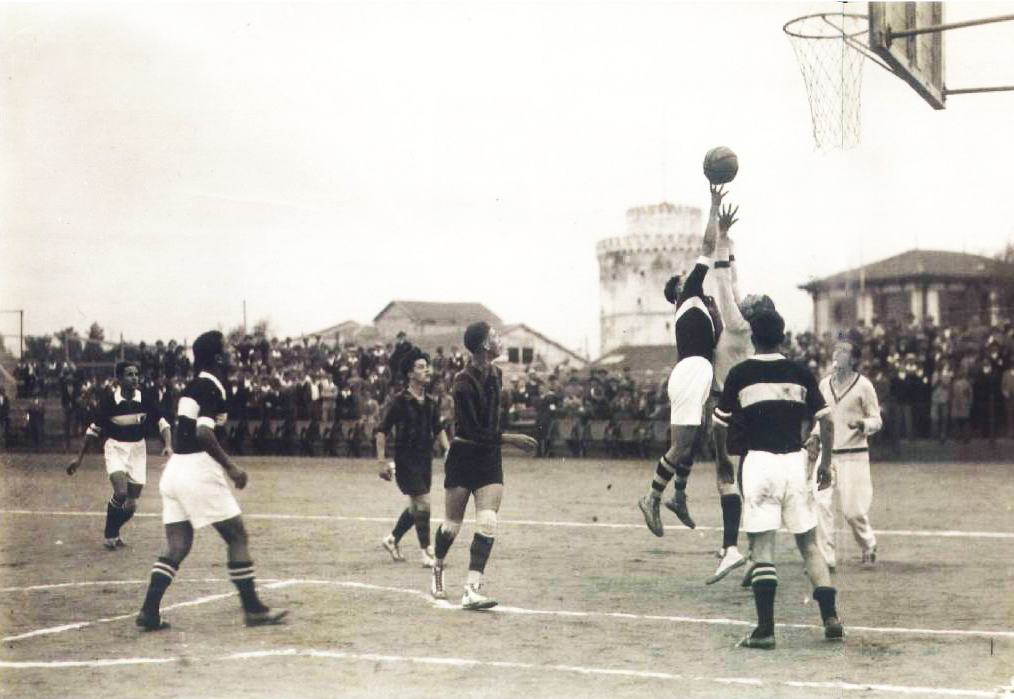
PAOK vs YMCA Thessaloniki in the '20s

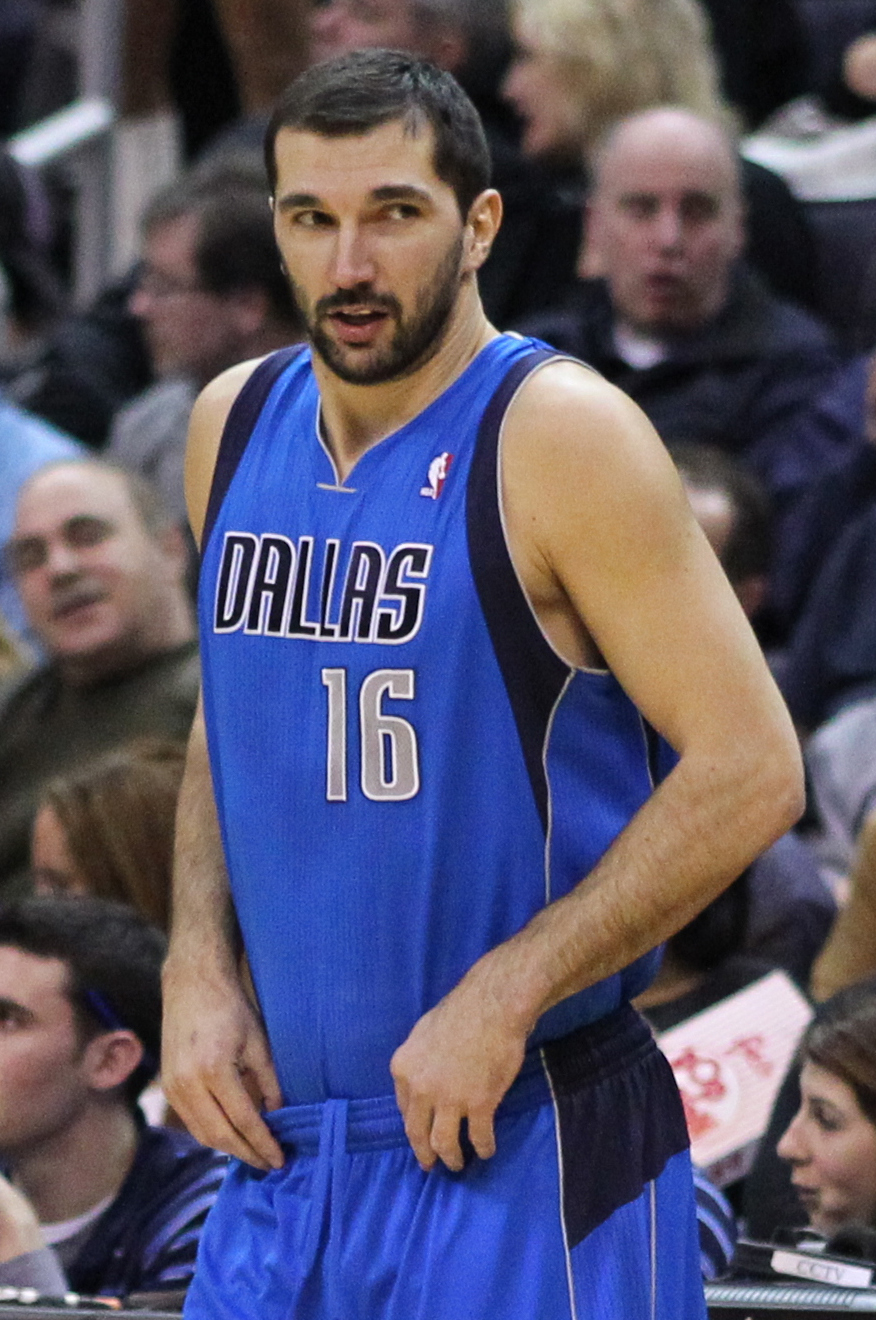
Peja Stojaković

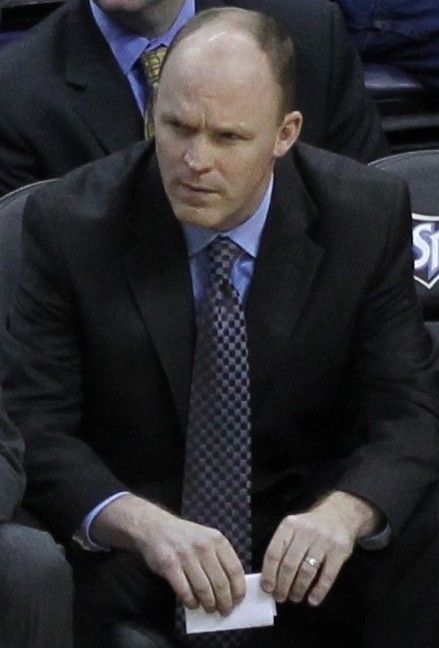
Scott Skiles

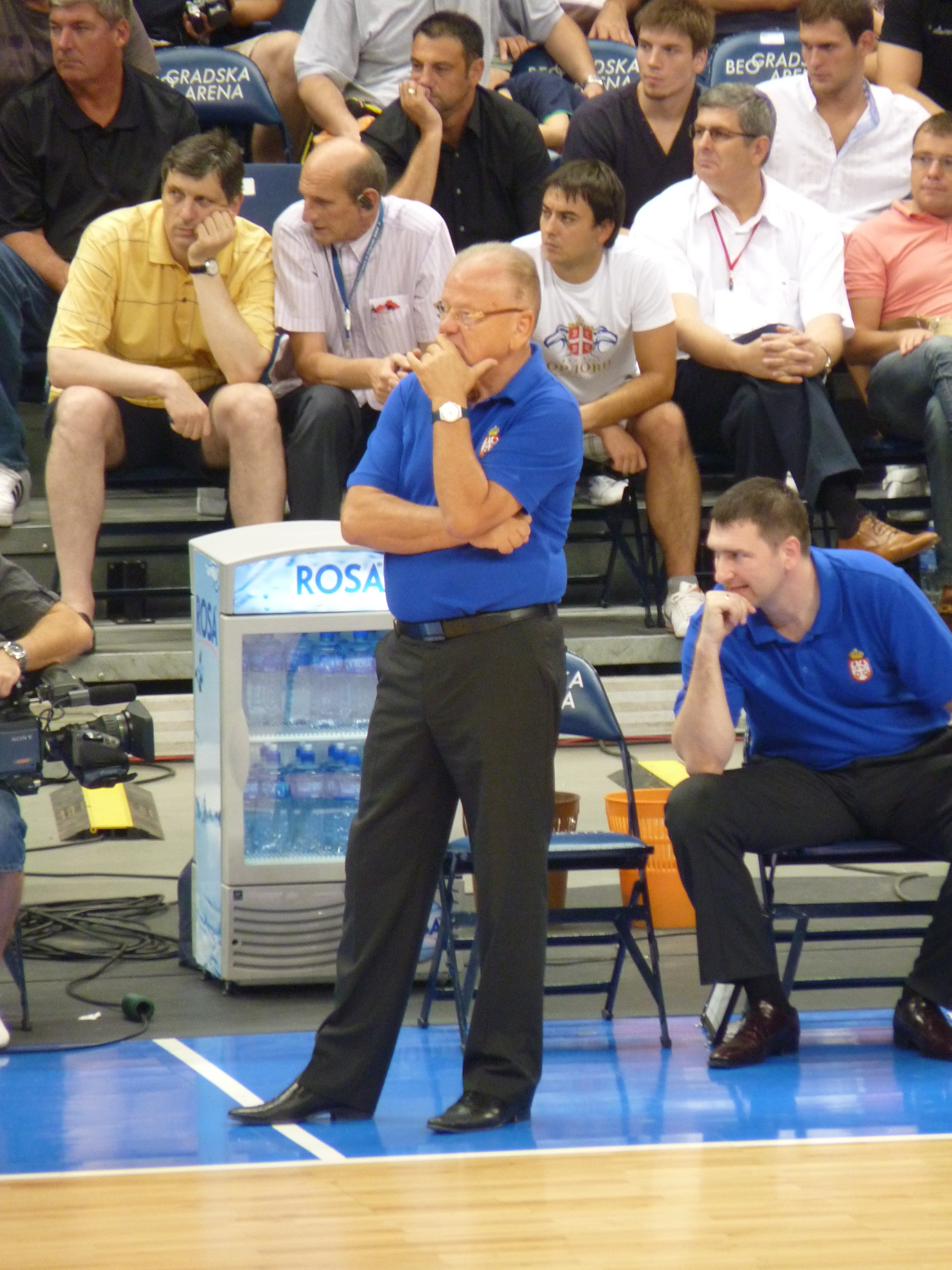
Dušan Ivković, coach of the 1992 champion team

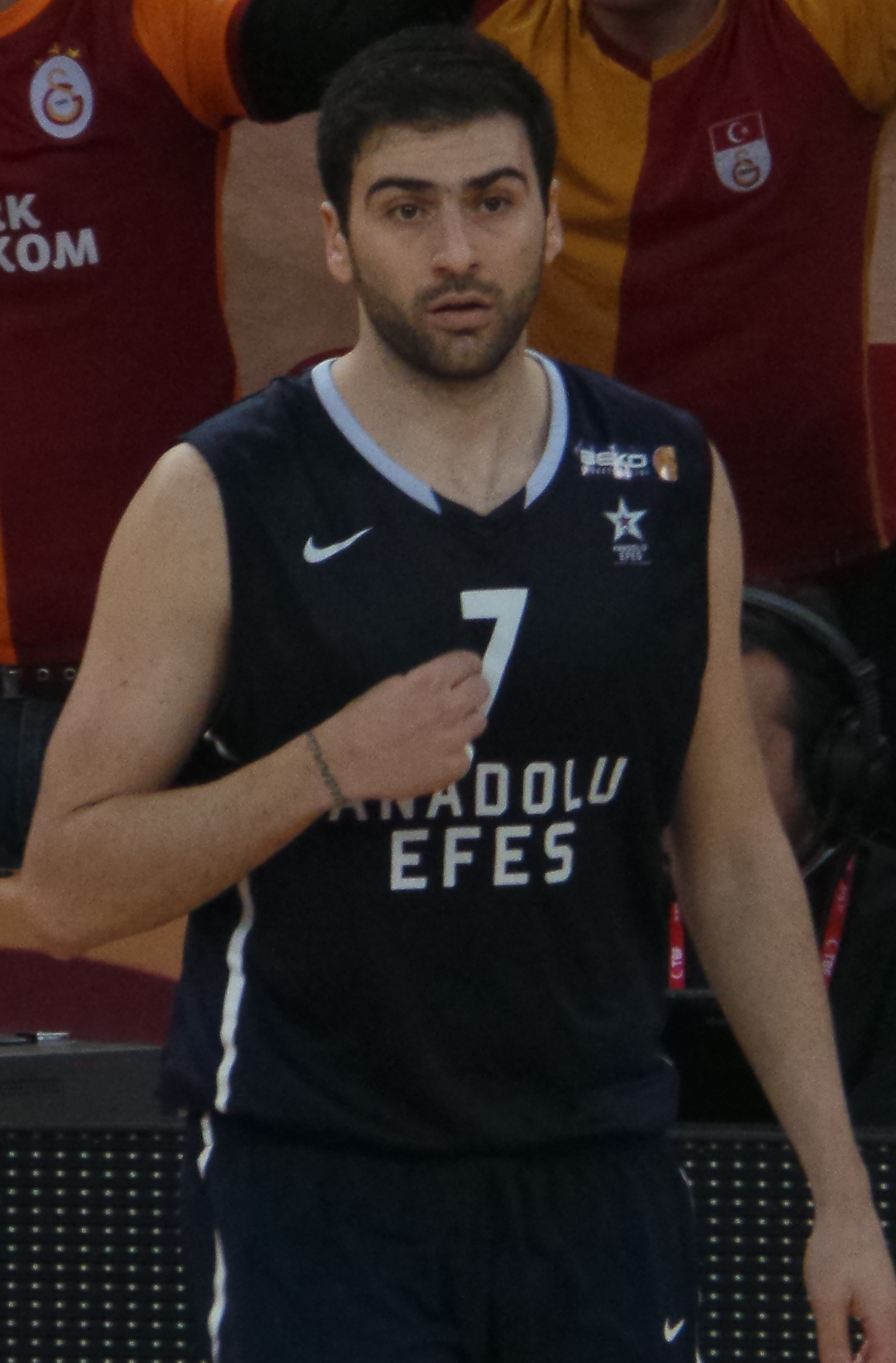
Kostas Vasileiadis

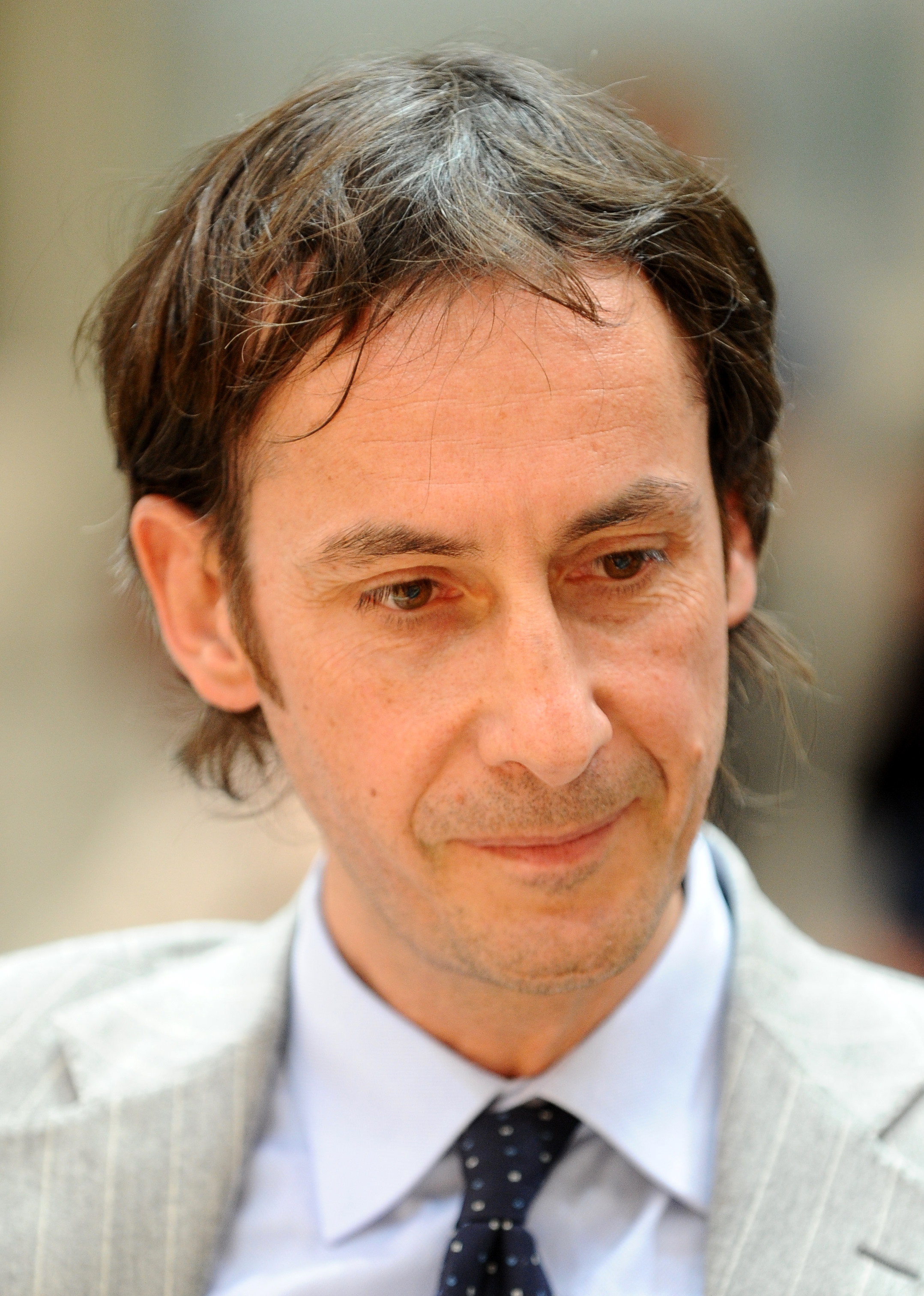
Claudio Coldebella

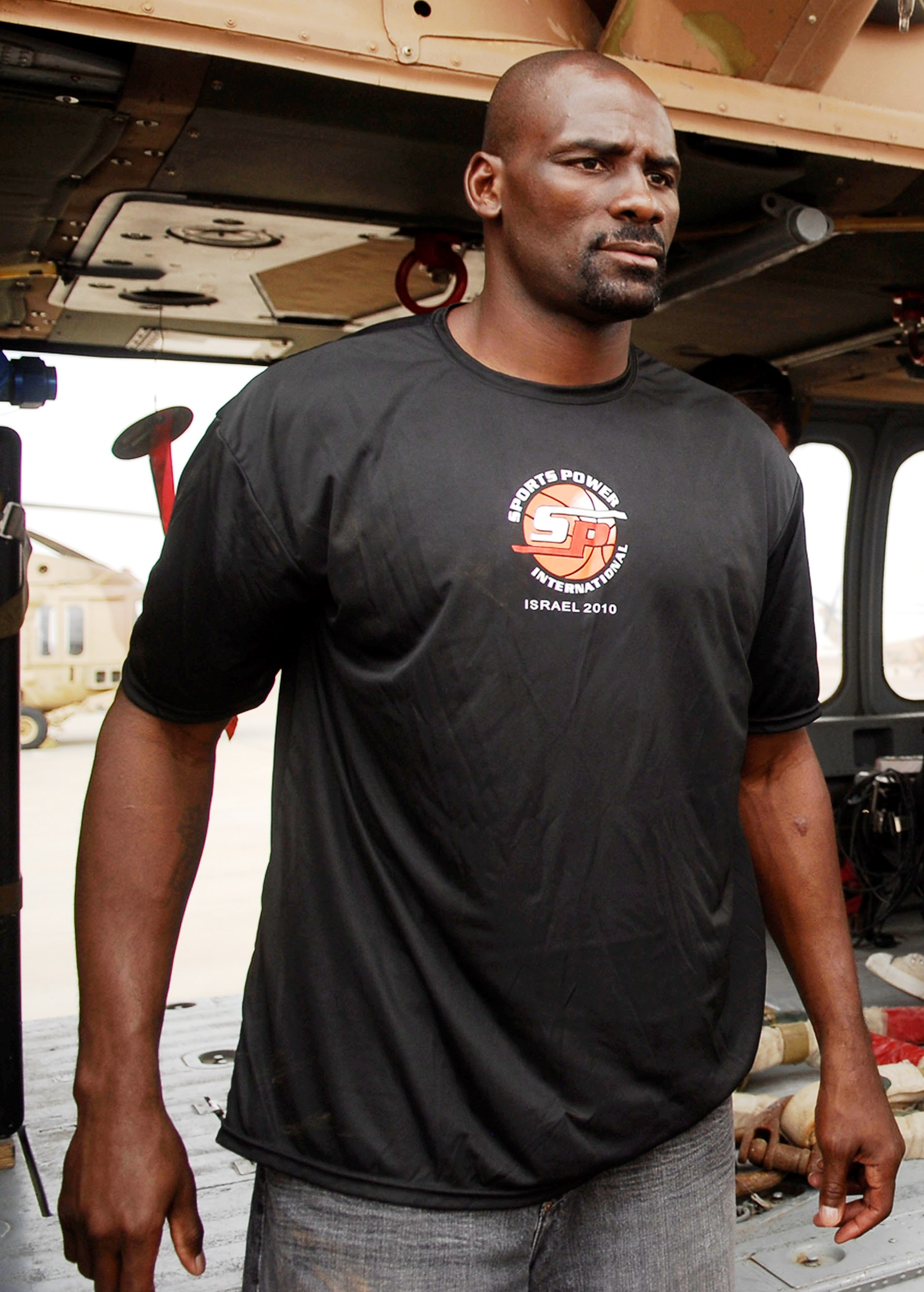
Anthony Bonner

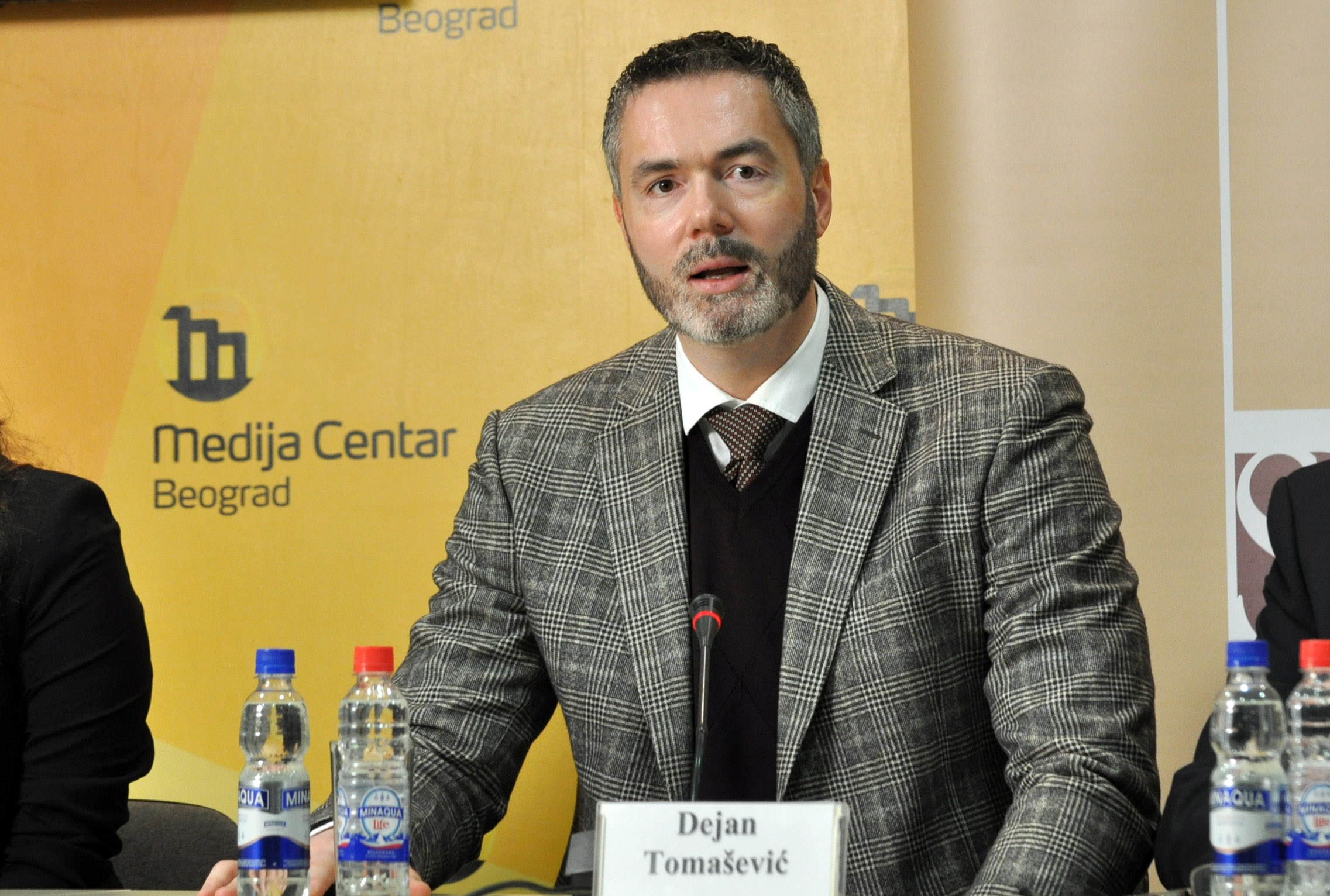
Dejan Tomašević
Volleyball

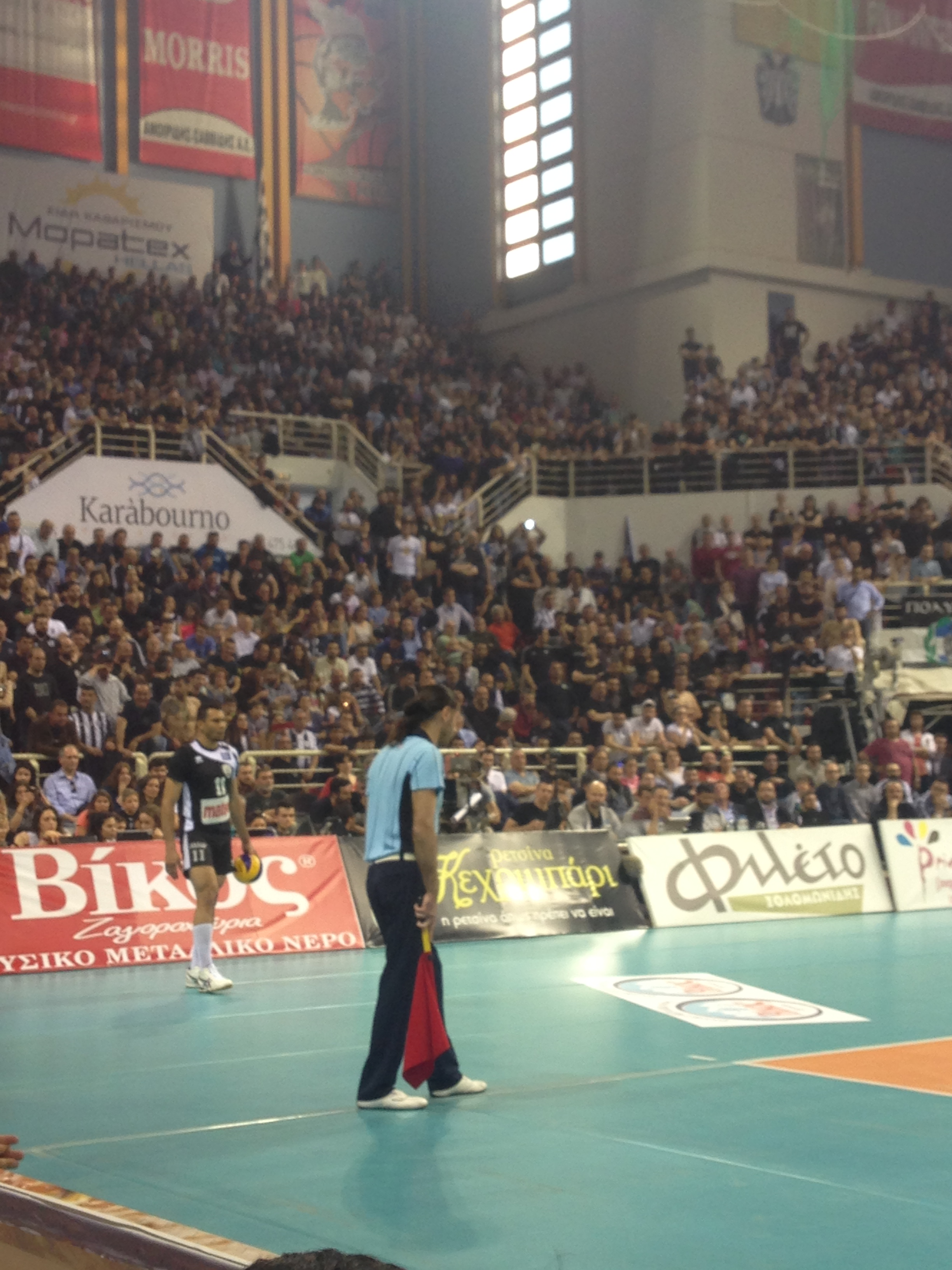
Ernardo Gómez

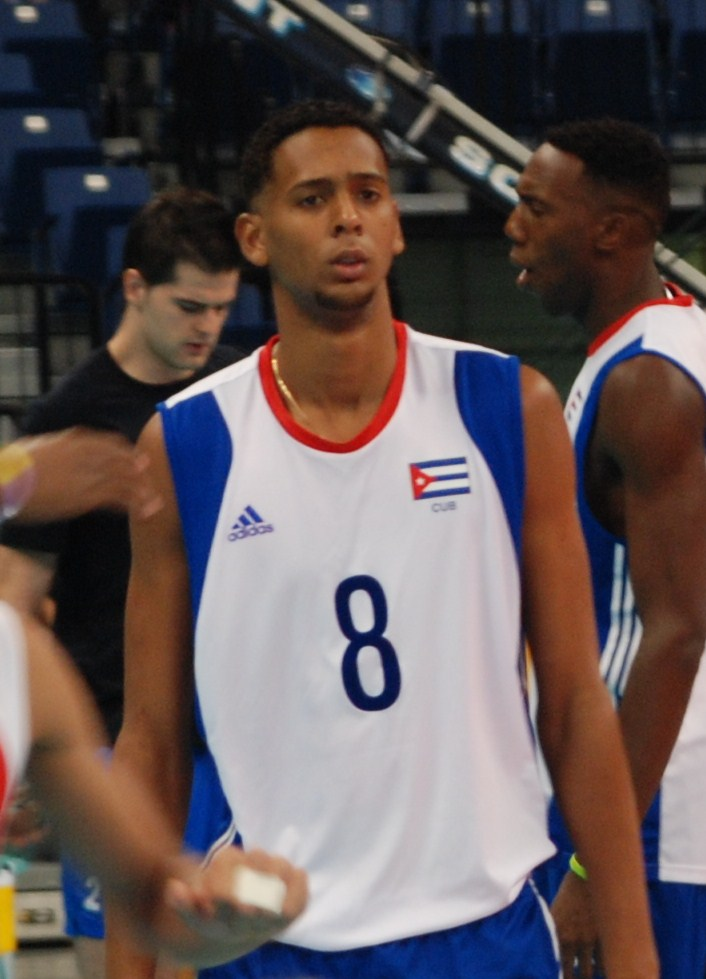
Rolando Cepeda

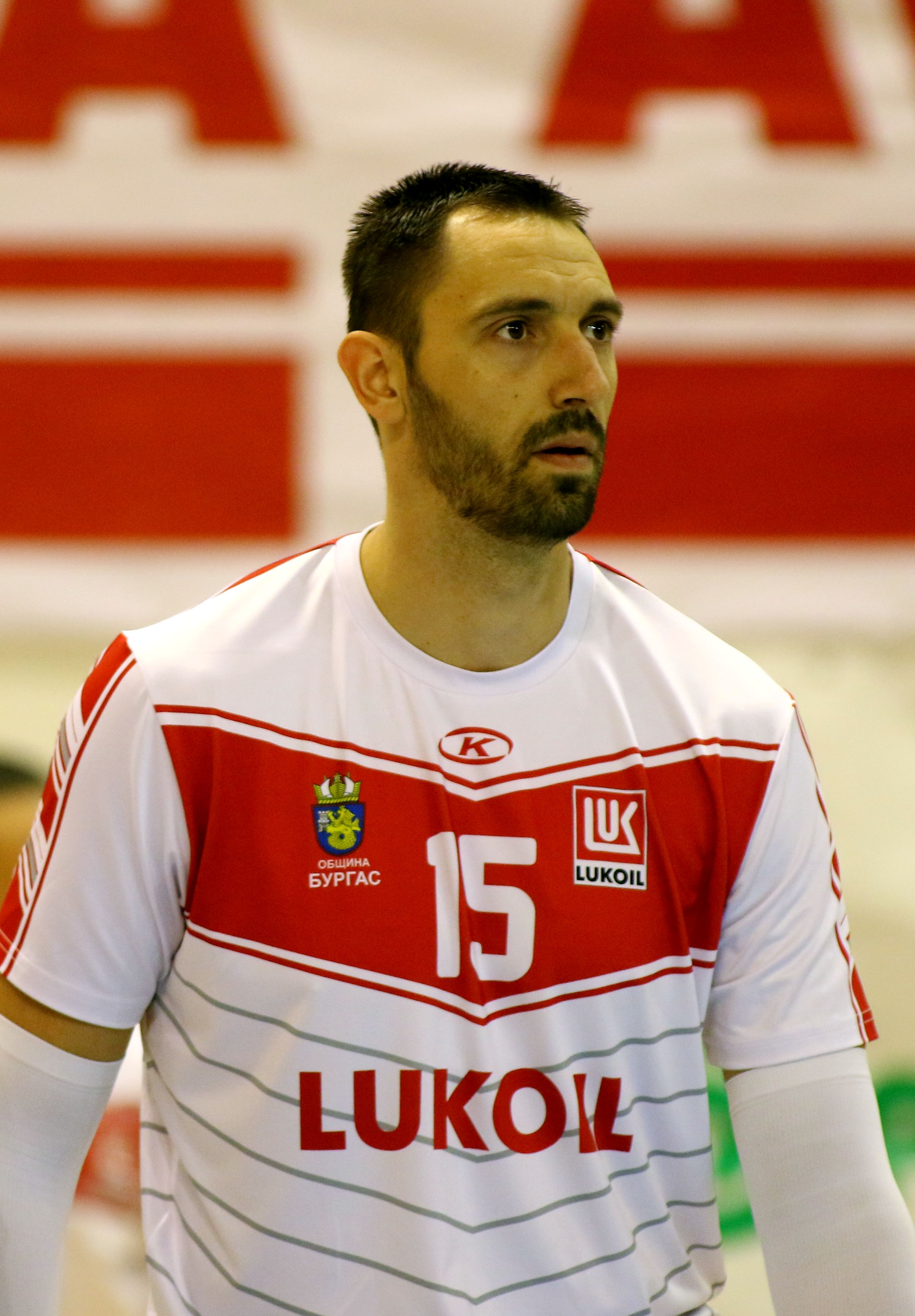
Nikolay Uchikov

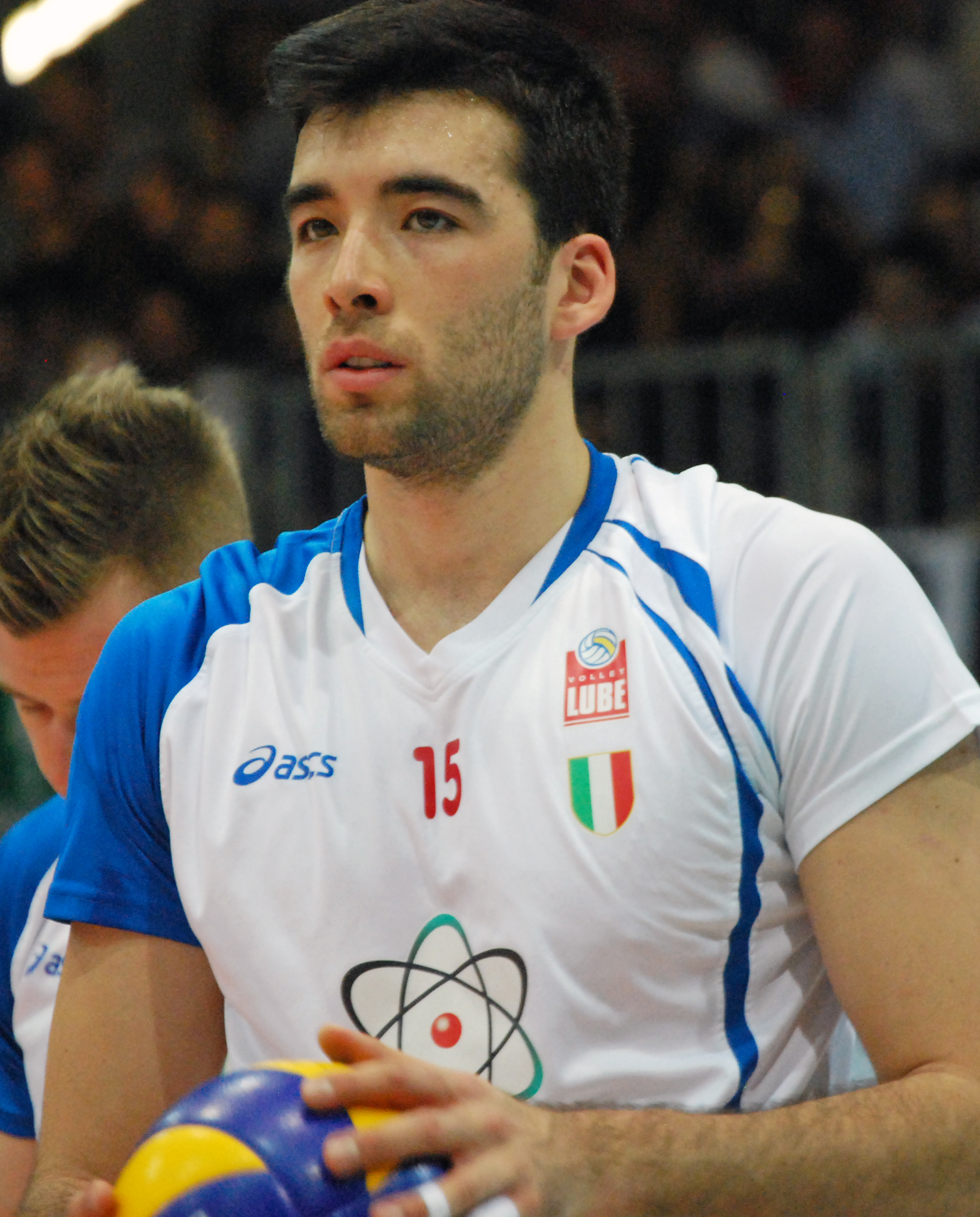
Saša Starović

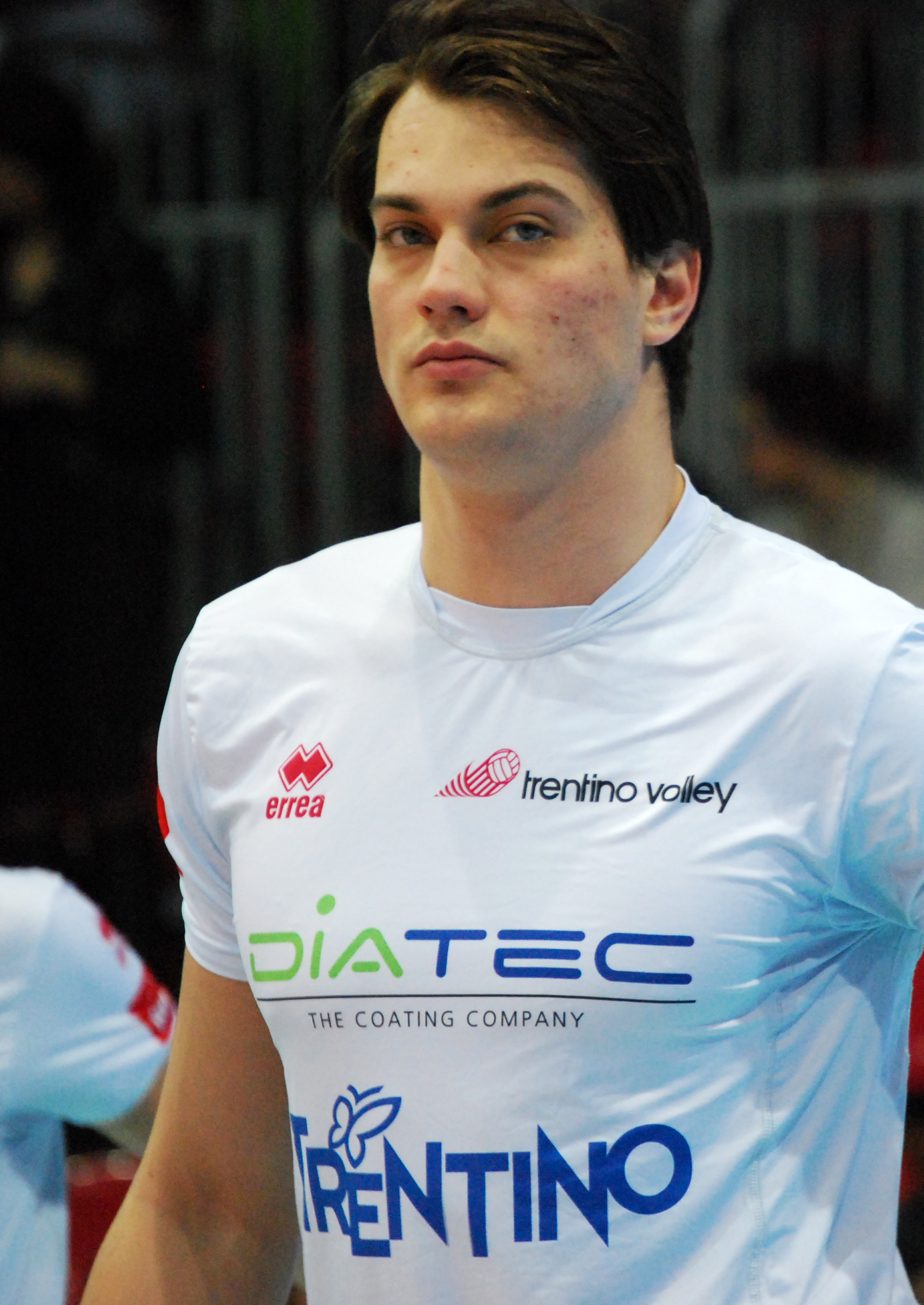
Mitar Tzourits

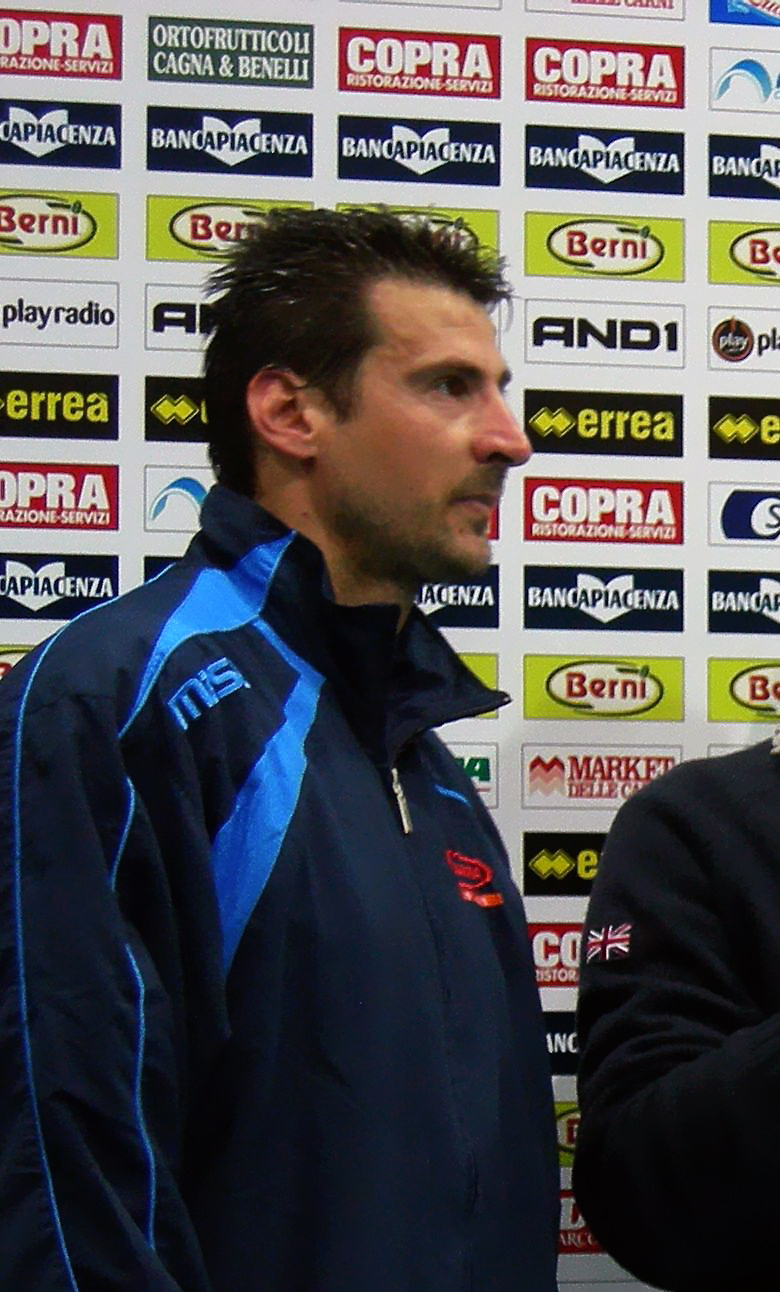
Vladimir Grbić

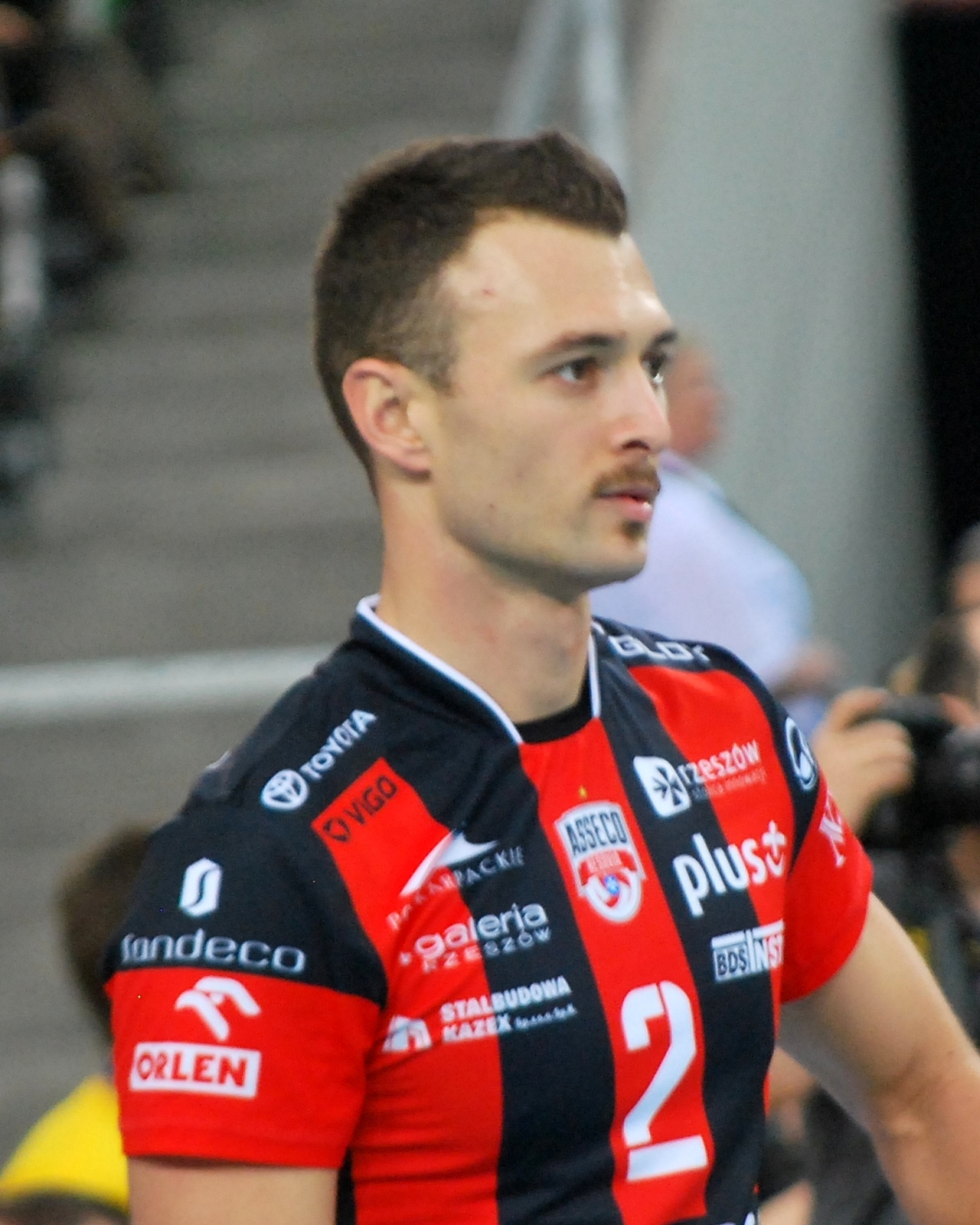
Paul Lotman

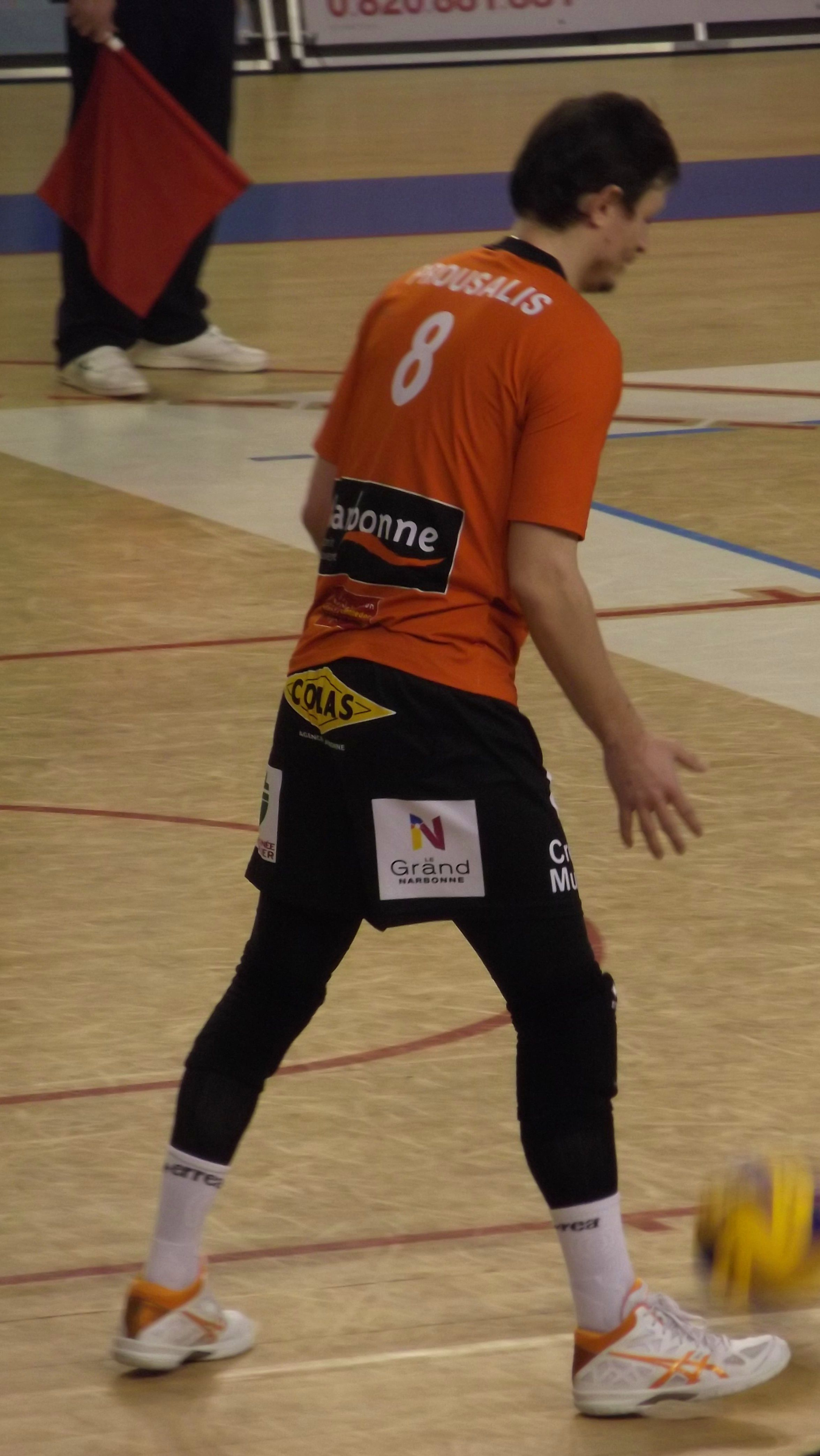
Kostas Prousalis
