= Thessaloniki Union of Constantinopolitans =

The Thessaloniki Union of Constantinopolitans (Greek: Ένωσις Κωνσταντινουπολιτών Θεσσαλονίκης, romanized: Enosis Konstantinoupoliton Thessalonikis) was a social and political association, which was founded by Greek refugees from Constantinople in Thessaloniki on 15 January 1923.

== Historical Background ==
In 1877 the Greek community of Constantinople founded the athletic and cultural club Clio Sports Club, which renamed to Hermes Sport Club in 1884. In 1914, it was founded as a soccer department under the name Greek Football Team (Greek: Ελληνκή Ομάδα Ποδοσφαίρου). After the Greco-Turkish War the team was named Pera Club. Then it moved to France and took part in football tournaments. Many of them was staying in France and other returned to Constantinople and joined in Pera Club. On the other hand, the majority of Greek members of Pera Club settled in Thessaloniki and founded the Thessaloniki Union of Constantinopolitans.

By coincidence, both the Union and Pera Club took approval from the authorities the same day, 10 March 1923.

== Foundation and purposes of the Union ==
The first meeting of Constantinopolitan refugees took place on Sunday, 15 January 1923 and the participants were more than 150. The first statute was voted through on 22 January and the first Administrative Council was elected on 12 February 1923. The first president was the physician Theofylaktos Theofylaktou. According to the first statement (article 33) all other Constantinopolitan unions would be its subsidiaries.

The first activities of the Union was the organization, entertainment, care, and integration of refugees with the local people, and organized lectures for it. Moreover, they founded a library and organized holidays in Constantinople the following years.

Furthermore, Enosis took part in political facts and helped refugees who settled in Macedonia to obtain Greek citizenship. Also, took the responsibility for the restoration of refugees after the Greek-Turkish agreement. Constantinopolitans were regarded by the Greek government as Turkish citizens and Turkey had expropriated their properties. The Treaty of Ankara (1930) defined the compensation for the lost fortunes of the Constantinopolitan refugees. Furthermore, Enosis and its member Petros Lenantis -who was during that period member of the Greek Parliament and PAOK's president succeeded changes at the Legislation 5170/1931 about the "estimate and the compensation of material assets".

The greatest achievement of Enosis was the efforts for the housing of refugees. In 1961 they founded the "Constantinople" Construction Corporation which constructed the settlement Konstantinoupolitika in Pylaia. Enosis continued its charities action until the 1960s. After the assimilation of refugees its activity flagged.

== Emblem and Seal ==
According to Article 28 of the first statute the emblem contained Hagia Sophia at the middle, and around it has the words Ένωσις Κωνσταντινουπολιτών Θεσσαλονίκης. In February 1924 the statute was revised because the settlement in Thessaloniki was seeming to be permanent. The new statute was endorsed on 6 April 1924 by the general meeting of the association. The new emblem was the Double-headed eagle, and was the same blazon which appeared in St. George's Cathedral, Istanbul.

== Sports Clubs ==
The first athletic club which created by members of EK was VAE (Greek: Βυζαντινή Αθλητική Ένωσις, Byzantine Athletic Union). The club has four departments (soccer, basketball, volleyball and baseball) and its emblem was the double head eagle. The club has briefly life and was absorbed by EK in April 1924. EK's new statement which approved on 8 April 1924 expected the foundation of Sports Department. This was consistent by VAE's former members and was name Athlitico Tmima tis Enosis Konstantinoupoliton (Athletic Department of E.K.)

During 1924-25 all athletic activities in Thessaloniki was postponed, due to the deterioration of refugees settlement.

On 10 June 1925 was taken part the first General Assembly of the athletic department. More than 120 athletes of Constantinupolitan origin took part and agreed to join the new club. Moreover, it was decided that words 'Athletic Department' converted to 'Athletic Union' and the new name of sports club became 'Athletic Union of Constantinopolitans of Thessaloniki' (AEK Thessaloniki).

The new club had football, cycling and athletic departments. The football club failed to register with Makedonia Football Clubs Association. The official excuse was that AEK Thessaloniki was a football club of a political association, which was against the rules. After this, members and players of the football team used article 27 of the new statute which gave them the authority to establish an independent club with the same name. So, the football department became independent on 27 December 1925, while the other departments of Enosis were operating simultaneous with it.

EK and AEK Thessaloniki had a conflict about the administration of the new club for almost 3 months. After a General Assembly in which AEK's members withdrew, and elected new administration which decided the establishment of a new club. The founding protocol was signed on 30 March 1926, and the new club named PAOK.
