= Cai Huijue =

Chinese swimmer (born 1980)

Personal information
- Born: 1980 (age 45–46)

Sport
- Sport: Swimming
- Strokes: Butterfly
Medal record
Representing China
Olympic Games
Bronze medal – third place	1996 Atlanta	4x100m medley relay
World Championships (SC)
Gold medal – first place	1997 Gothenburg	4x100m medley relay
Silver medal – second place	1997 Gothenburg	100m butterfly

Cai Huijue (born 1980) is a Chinese swimmer and Olympic medalist. She participated at the 1996 Summer Olympics in Atlanta, winning a bronze medal in 4 x 100 metre medley relay.
