= Georgios Giziotis =

Greek swimmer

Personal information
- Born: 22 August 1972 (age 53)

Sport
- Sport: Swimming

Georgios Giziotis (born 22 August 1972) is a Greek swimmer. He competed in two events at the 1996 Summer Olympics.
