= Simeon Georgaras =

Greek water polo player

Personal information
- Born: February 3, 1973 (age 52)

Sport
- Sport: Water polo

Simeon Georgaras (born 3 February 1973) is a Greek former water polo player who competed in the 1996 Summer Olympics.
