= Marina Karystinou =

Greek swimmer

Personal information
- Born: 5 January 1976 (age 50)

Sport
- Sport: Swimming

Marina Karystinou (born 5 January 1976) is a Greek swimmer. She competed in three events at the 1996 Summer Olympics.
