= Antonia Machaira =

Greek swimmer (born 1971)

Personal information
- Nickname: Tonia
- Nationality: Greece
- Born: 21 May 1971 (age 55) Chania or Athens
- Height: 1.80 m (5 ft 11 in)
- Weight: 65 kg (143 lb)

Sport
- Sport: Swimming
- Strokes: Freestyle
- Club: Retired
- College team: Southern Illinois Salukis (USA)
- Coach: Rick Walker (USA)
Medal record
Women's swimming
Representing Greece
Mediterranean Games
Silver medal – second place	2001 Tunis	4×100 m freestyle
Bronze medal – third place	1993 Languedoc	4×100 m freestyle

Antonia "Tonia" Machaira (Greek: Αντωνία "Τόνια" Μαχαίρα; born May 21, 1971) is a retired Greek swimmer, who specialized in sprint and middle-distance freestyle events. She represented Greece in two editions of the Olympic Games (1996 and 2000), and later helped the Greeks capture the silver medal in the freestyle relay (3:48.74) at the 2001 Mediterranean Games in Tunis, Tunisia.

Machaira attended the Southern Illinois University in Carbondale, Illinois, where she majored in nutrition and played for the Southern Illinois Salukis under head coach Rick Walker. While swimming for the Salukis, she posted career bests in the 100-yard freestyle (50.64) and 200-yard freestyle (1:48.31), both of which stood for more than a decade in the school's record books.

Machaira made her official debut, as a 25-year-old, at the 1996 Summer Olympics in Atlanta. She failed to medal in any of her individual events, finishing fourteenth from a consolation final in the 200 m freestyle (2:03.19), thirty-first in the 100 m freestyle (57.92), and thirty-fourth in the 400 m freestyle (4:24.05). In the 4 × 100 m medley relay, Machaira, along with Katerina Klepkou, Aikaterini Sarakatsani, and Marina Karystinou, finished twenty-second from the prelims in a final time of 4:24.80.

At the 2000 Summer Olympics in Sydney, Machaira drastically shortened her program, swimming only in the 100 m freestyle. She achieved a FINA A-standard of 56.17 from the European Championships in Helsinki, Finland. She challenged seven other swimmers in heat five, including U.S. legend and top favorite Dara Torres. With one swimmer scratching out of the race in her heat, Machaira edged out Austria's Judith Draxler on the final lap to pick up a sixth seed by 16-hundredths of a second in 57.24. Machaira failed to advance into the semifinals, as she placed twenty-fifth overall in the prelims.

At the 2001 Mediterranean Games in Tunis, Tunisia, Machaira helped the Greeks captured a silver medal in the 4 × 100 m freestyle relay with a sterling time of 3:48.74.
