= Aikaterini Klepkou =

Greek swimmer

Personal information
- Born: 22 May 1972 (age 54)

Sport
- Sport: Swimming

Aikaterini Klepkou (born 22 May 1972) is a Greek swimmer. She competed in three events at the 1996 Summer Olympics.
