= 2017–18 Volleyleague (Greece) =

Volley League 2017–18
- League: Greek Volley League
- Sport: Volleyball
- Duration: 28 October 2017 – 24 March 2018 (regular season); 27 March – 9 May (finals)
- Teams: 12
- TV partner: ERT

Regular season
- Season champions: Olympiacos Piraeus
- Season MVP: (Bulgaria) Todor Aleksiev
- Top scorer: (Canada) Taylor Hunt 645 points

Finals
- Champions: Olympiacos Piraeus 28th title
- Runners-up: PAOK

Volleyleague seasons
- 2016–17 2018–19

The 2017–18 Greek Volleyleague is the 50th national championship and the 8th under the Volleyleague name. It is the highest volleyball league in Greece. Twelve teams were participating in the 2017–18 season; PAOK was the defending champion. Olympiacos Piraeus won its 28th championship.

== Teams ==
Twelve teams are participating in the 2017–18 season. The ten highest-ranked teams from the 2016–17 Volleyleague final standings were: PAOK, Olympiacos Piraeus, Panathinaikos Athens, Pamvohaikos Vocha, Kifissia, Foinikas Syros, Ethnikos Alexandroupolis, Iraklis Thessaloniki, Iraklis Chalkidas and Panachaiki. The two promoted teams from A2 Ethniki were Ethnikos Piraeus and Niki Aiginiou. Two teams from the 2016–17 Volleyleague were demoted to A2 Ethniki: Kyzikos Nea Peramos and Orestiada.

2017–18 Volleyleague season club locations

Team	Appearances	Manager	Home City
Ethnikos Alexandroupolis	40	Thanasis Moustakidis	Alexandroupoli
Ethnikos Piraeus	6	Sakis Psaras	Piraeus
Iraklis Thessaloniki	47	Ioannis Orphanos	Thessaloniki
Iraklis Chalkidas	2	Spyros Golitsis	Chalkida
Kifissia	17	Kostas Arseniadis	Athens
Niki Aiginiou	3	Thanasis Strantzalis	Aiginio
Olympiacos Piraeus	50	Fernando Munioz Banitez	Piraeus
Pamvohaikos Vocha	7	Kostas Delikostas	Vrachati
Panathinaikos Athens	50	Dimitrios Andreopoulos	Athens
Panachaiki	4	Panagiotis Papadopoulos - Stavros Stamatopoulos (26/12/17)	Patras
PAOK	39	Danielle Ricci	Thessaloniki
Foinikas Syros	9	Sasha Stefanovich - Oscar Kacmarski (29/11/17)	Syros

== Regular season ==
The regular season is held in a round-robin format, every team contesting 22 games in total. At the end of the regular season, teams occupying positions 1–8 advance to the 2017–18 Volleyleague Greece Playoffs, while teams occupying positions 9–12 compete in the 2017–18 Volleyleague Greece Playouts.

=== League table ===
P	Team	Pt.	G	W	L	Set	Sc.	Result
1	Olympiacos Piraeus	64	22	22	0	66–9	7,33	Play-offs
2	PAOK	52	22	17	5	59–22	2,68	Play-offs
3	Foinikas Syros	37	22	12	10	46–39	1,18	Play-offs
4	Iraklis	36	22	12	10	45–43	1,05	Play-offs
5	Kifissia	33	22	12	10	45–44	1,02	Play-offs
6	Iraklis Chalkidas	31	22	9	13	41–46	0,89	Play-offs
7	Ethnikos Piraeus	31	22	10	12	37–43	0,86	Play-offs
8	Pamvohaikos	30	22	11	11	40–44	0,91	Play-offs
9	Niki Aiginiou	29	22	11	11	40–47	0,85	Play out
10	Ethnikos Alexandroupolis	26	22	8	14	36–49	0,73	Play out
11	Panathinaikos	25	22	7	15	38–49	0,77	Play out
12	Panachaiki	2	22	0	22	8–66	0,12	Play out

=== Results ===
Home \ Away	ETA	ETH	IRA	IRC	KIF	NIK	OSFP	VCH	PAO	PAN	PAOK	SYR
Ethnikos Alexandroupolis		3–1	3–2	0–3	2–3	2–3	1–3	2–3	3–1	3–0	0–3	0–3
Ethnikos Piraeus	2–3		3–1	3–2	3–0	3–0	0–3	0–3	1–3	3–1	0–3	0–3
Iraklis	3–2	3–2		3–0	3–1	3–2	2–3	3–1	3–1	3–0	3–2	3–2
Iraklis Chalkidas	3–1	3–1	3–0		2–3	2–3	0–3	1–3	0–3	3–2	0–3	2–3
Kifissia	3–1	1–3	3–1	3–1		1–3	1–3	3–0	3–1	3–0	2–3	3–2
Niki Aiginiou	3–0	3–0	1–3	1–3	3–1		0–3	1–3	3–2	3–1	1–3	1–3
Olympiacos Piraeus	3–0	3–0	3–0	3–2	3–0	3–0		3–0	3–1	3–0	3–1	3–0
Pamvohaikos	3–1	1–3	1–3	0–3	3–2	2–3	0–3		3–0	3–0	0–3	3–2
Panathinaikos	1–3	0–3	3–0	2–3	2–3	2–3	0–3	2–3		3–0	3–2	3–1
Panachaiki	0–3	0–3	1–3	0–3	0–3	1–3	0–3	0–3	0–3		0–3	2–3
PAOK	3–0	3–0	3–0	3–2	3–0	3–0	1–3	3–1	3–1	3–0		2–3
Foinikas Syros	0–3	1–3	3–0	3–0	2–3	3–0	0–3	3–1	3–1	3–0	0–3	

Legend: Blue = home team win; Red = away team win.

== Play out, positions 9−11 ==
Teams in positions 9–11 after the end of regular season participated in Play outs for the final classification in these positions.

=== Table ===
P	Team	Pt.	G	W	L	Set	Sc.	Result
1	Ethnikos Alexandroupolis	7	3	2	1	8–4	2.00	2018-19 Volleyleague Greece
2	Panathinaikos	6	3	2	1	8–6	1.33	2018-19 Volleyleague Greece
3	Niki Aiginiou	4	4	1	3	5–11	0.45	Relegation in Α2

== Playoffs, positions 1−8 ==
Teams in positions 1–8 after the end of regular season participated in Play off for the final classification.

Round of 8
1	Olympiacos	2
8	Pamvohaikos	0
4	Iraklis	0
5	Kifisia	2
2	PAOK Thessaloniki	2
7	Ethnikos Piraeus	0
3	Foinikas Syros	2
6	Iraklis Chalkidas	0

Semifinals
Olympiacos	3
Kifisia	0
PAOK Thessaloniki	3
Foinikas Syros	0

Final
Olympiacos	3
PAOK Thessaloniki	0

== Round of 8 ==
The four pairings for the Round of 8 were determined from the positions after the end of the regular season. The pairings were between the teams in 1st–8th, 2nd–7th, 3rd–6th and 4th–5th positions of the regular season. The first team in two victories advancers to the next round. The four eliminated teams were placed in positions 5–8 according to the classification of the regular season.

=== (1) Olympiacos – (8) Pamvochaikos (2–0) ===
Date	Time	Home team	Score	Away team	1st set	2nd set	3rd set	4th set	5th set	Total	Report
27 Mar.	16:30	Olympiacos Piraeus	3–0	Pamvohaikos	25–19	25–20	25–14	–	–	75–53	
14 Apr.	17:00	Pamvohaikos	1–3	Olympiacos Piraeus	21–25	25–23	21–25	21–25	–	88–98	

==== (2) PAOK – (7) Ethnikos Piraeus (2–0) ====
Date	Time	Home team	Score	Away team	1st set	2nd set	3rd set	4th set	5th set	Total	Report
5 Apr.	16:30	PAOK	3–0	Ethnikos Piraeus	25–19	25–22	25–14	–	–	75–55	
12 Apr.	16:30	Ethnikos Piraeus	1–3	PAOK	25–23	24–26	22–25	21–25	–	92–99	

==== (3) Foinikas Syros – (6) Iraklis Chalkidas (2–0) ====
Date	Time	Home team	Score	Away team	1st set	2nd set	3rd set	4th set	5th set	Total	Report
4 Apr.	19:00	Foinikas Syros	3–2	Iraklis Chalkidas	25–27	25–19	23–25	25–20	15–11	113–102	
12 Apr.	18:00	Iraklis Chalkidas	1–3	Foinikas Syros	18–25	23–25	26–24	20–25	–	87–99	

==== (4) Iraklis – (5) Kifissia (0–2) ====
Date	Time	Home team	Score	Away team	1st set	2nd set	3rd set	4th set	5th set	Total	Report
4 Apr.	18:00	Iraklis	0–3	Kifissia	20–25	24–26	16–25	–	–	60–76	
12 Apr.	19:00	Kifissia	3–0	Iraklis	25–21	25–20	25–23	–	–	75–64	

== Semifinals ==
=== (1) Olympiakos – (5) Kifissia (3–0) ===
Date	Time	Home team	Score	Away team	1st set	2nd set	3rd set	4th set	5th set	Total	Report
25 Apr.	19:00	Olympiacos Piraeus	3–0	Kifissia	25–18	25–21	25–17	–	–	75–56	
27 Apr.	17:00	Olympiacos Piraeus	3–0	Kifissia	25–20	25–20	25–23	–	–	75–63	
30 Apr.	18:00	Kifissia	0–3	Olympiacos Piraeus	18–25	21–25	18–25	–	–	57–75	

==== (2) PAOK – (3) Foinikas Syros (2–0) ====
Date	Time	Home team	Score	Away team	1st set	2nd set	3rd set	4th set	5th set	Total	Report
25 Apr.	17:00	PAOK	3–1	Foinikas Syros	25–18	25–21	23–25	27–25	–	100–89	
27 Αpr.	19:00	PAOK	3–0	Foinikas Syros	25–18	25–14	25–19	–	–	75–51	
30 Apr.	20:00	Foinikas Syros	2–3	PAOK	25–18	22–25	18–25	25–21	11–15	101–104	

== Finals ==
=== (1) Olympiacos – (2) PAOK (3–0) ===
Date	Time	Home team	Score	Away team	1st set	2nd set	3rd set	4th set	5th set	Total	Report
3 May.	19:00	Olympiacos Piraeus	3–2	PAOK	25–15	17–25	25–22	22–25	15–06	104–93	
6 May.	19:00	PAOK	0–3	Olympiacos Piraeus	19–25	23–25	21–25	–	–	63–75	
9 May.	19:00	Olympiacos Piraeus	3–0	PAOK	25–22	25–21	25–20	–	–	75–63	

== Final standings ==
P	Team	Result
1st place, gold medalist(s)	Olympiacos Piraeus	CEV Cup 2018–19
2nd place, silver medalist(s)	PAOK	Champions League 2018–19
3rd place, bronze medalist(s)	Foinikas Syros	
4	Kifissia	
5	Iraklis	
6	Iraklis Chalkidas	
7	Ethnikos Piraeus	
8	Pamvohaikos	
9	Ethnikos Alexandroupolis	
10	Panathinaikos	
11	Niki Aiginiou	Relegation in Α2
12	Panachaiki	Relegation in Α2
