= Athanasios Maroulis =

Greek volleyball player (born 1988)

Personal information
- Nationality: Greek
- Born: 9 July 1988 (age 38)
- Height: 191 cm (6 ft 3 in)
- Weight: 83 kg (183 lb)
- Spike: 336 cm (132 in)
- Block: 320 cm (126 in)

Volleyball information
- Position: Setter
- Current club: Foinikas Syros
- Number: 2

Career
Years	Teams
2007–2008; 2008–2009; 2009–2012; 2012–2015; 2015–2017; 2017–2018; 2018; 2018–2019; 2019–2020; 2020–2021; 2021–	(Greece) AEK (Greece) PAOK (Greece) Lamia (Greece) Olympiacos (Greece) Panathinaikos (Greece) Foinikas Syros (France) Saint Quentin Volley (Greece) AE Komotini (Switzerland) Biogas Volley Näfels (Israel) Hapoel Menashe Hadera (Greece) Foinikas Syros

National team
Greece
- Last updated: 14 January 2016

Athanasios "Thanos" Maroulis (born 9 July 1988) is a Greek male volleyball player. He is part of the Greece men's national volleyball team. On club level he plays for the Greek club Foinikas Syros.
