= Andreas-Dimitrios Frangos =

Greek volleyball player (born 1989)

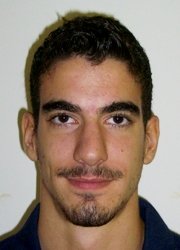
- Andreas Dimitrios Fragkos 2013

Personal information
- Nationality: Greek
- Born: 21 December 1989 (age 36); Athens, Greece
- Height: 201 cm (6 ft 7 in)
- Weight: 93 kg (205 lb)
- Spike: 320 cm (126 in)
- Block: 315 cm (124 in)

Volleyball information
- Position: Outside hitter
- Current club: Panathinaikos
- Number: 15

Career
Years	Teams
2007–2010	(Greece) Panellinios Athens
2010–2011	(Greece) Olympiacos Piraeus
2011–2014	(Italy) Top Volley Latina
2014–2015	(Iran) Matin Varamin VC
2015–2016	(France) Narbonne Volley
2016–2017	(Greece) Olympiacos Piraeus
2017	(Turkey) Afyon Belediye Yüntaş
2017–2018	(South Korea) Cheonan Hyundai Skywalkers
2018–2019	(Greece) Olympiacos Piraeus
2019	(Germany) United Volleys Frankfurt
2019–2021	(Belgium) Knack Volley Roeselare
2021–2022	(Greece) Foinikas Syros
2022–	(Greece) Panathinaikos

National team
2008–	Greece

Andreas-Dimitrios Frangos (Greek: Ανδρέας-Δημήτριος Φράγκος) (born 21 December 1989) is a Greek male volleyball player. He is part of the Greece men's national volleyball team. On club level, he currently plays for the Greek club Panathinaikos.
