= Gerasimos Kanellos =

Greek volleyball player (born 1987)

Makis Kanellos

Personal information
- Full name: Gerasimos Kanellos
- Nationality: Greek
- Born: 25 August 1987 (age 39)
- Height: 198 cm (6 ft 6 in)
- Weight: 88 kg (194 lb)
- Spike: 304 cm (120 in)
- Block: 304 cm (120 in)

Volleyball information
- Position: Middle Blocker
- Current club: AEK
- Number: 13

Career
Years	Teams
2007–2011; 2011–2012; 2012–2013; 2013–2015; 2015–2016; 2016–2017; 2017–	Iraklis Thessaloniki; Olympiacos; PAOK; Pamvohaikos; Panathinaikos; Iraklis Chalkidas; AEK

National team
2007–2016	Greece

Gerasimos "Makis" Kanellos (born 25 August 1987) is a Greek male volleyball player. He is part of the Greece men's national volleyball team. He currently plays for AEK.
