= Timothée Carle =

French volleyball player (born 1995)

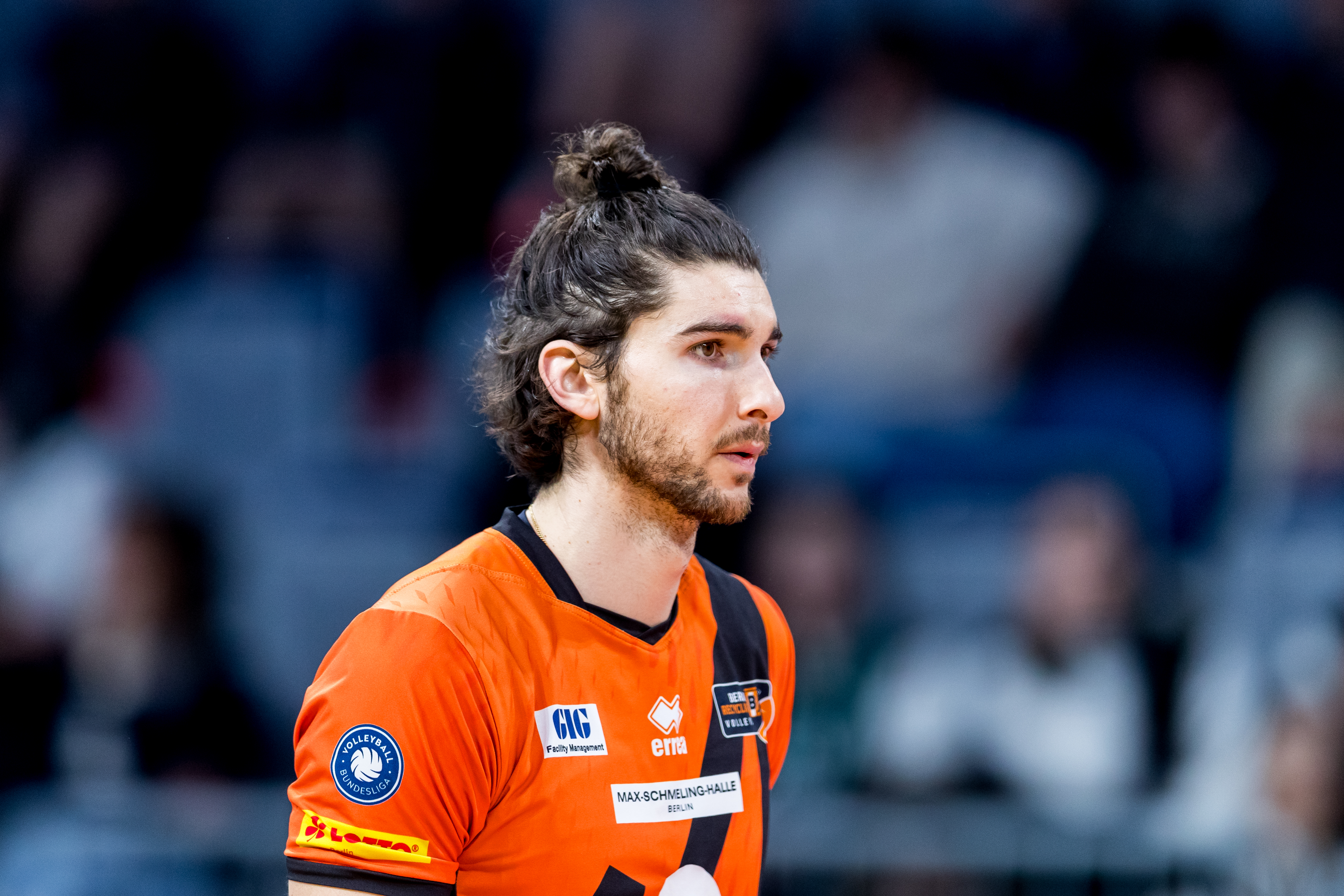
- Carle in 2024

Personal information
- Nickname: Tim
- Born: 30 November 1995 (age 30) Toulon, France
- Height: 1.98 m (6 ft 6 in)
- Weight: 89 kg (196 lb)
- Spike: 350 cm (138 in)

Volleyball information
- Position: Outside hitter
- Current club: Panathinaikos

Career
- Years: Team
- 2014–2017 2017–2019 2019–2020 2020–2024 2024–2025 2025–2026 2026–: AS Cannes; GFC Ajaccio VB; Volley Callipo; Berlin Recycling Volleys; Jastrzębski Węgiel; Wolfdogs Nagoya; Panathinaikos

National team
- Years: Team
- –: France
Honours
Men's volleyball
Representing France
FIVB Nations League
Gold medal – first place	2024 Łódź

Timothée Carle (born 30 November 1995) is a French professional volleyball player who plays as an outside hitter for Panathinaikos and the France national team.

== Honours ==
=== Club ===
- Domestic
  - 2020–21, 2021–22, 2022–23, 2023–24 German Championship, with Berlin Recycling Volleys
  - 2022–23, 2023–24 German Cup, with Berlin Recycling Volleys
  - 2020–21, 2021–22, 2022–23, 2023–24 German SuperCup, with Berlin Recycling Volleys
  - 2024–25 Polish Cup, with Jastrzębski Węgiel
