= Mauro Berruto =

Italian volleyball head coach (born 1969)

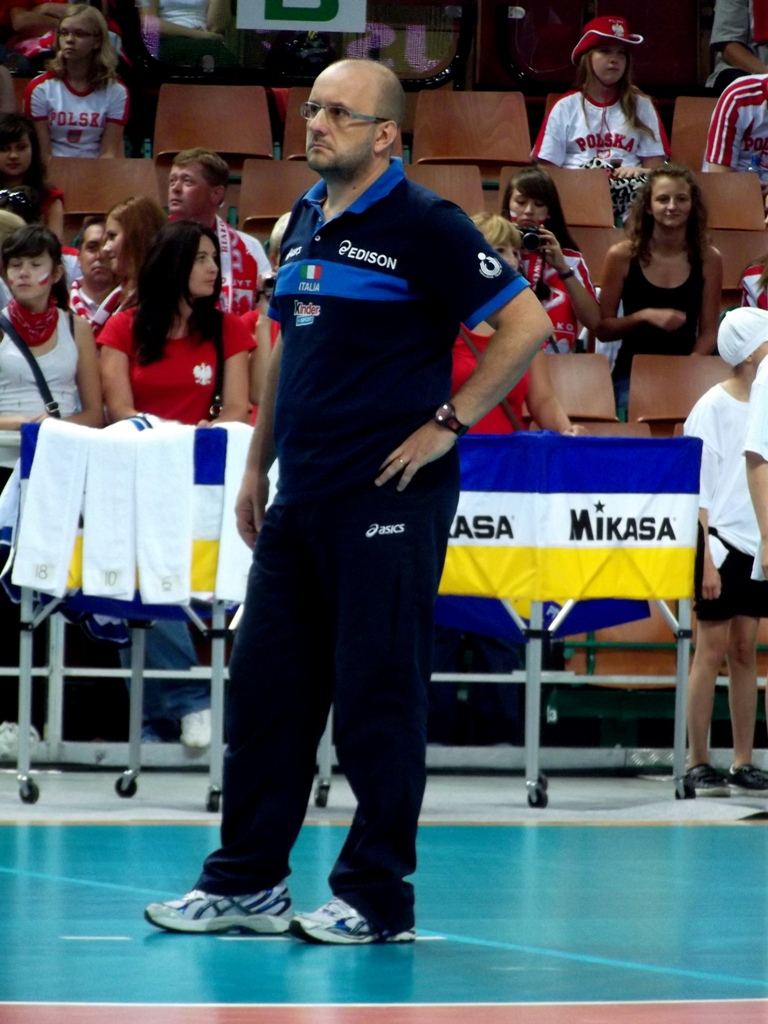

Personal information
- Full name: Mauro Berruto
- Born: May 8, 1969 (age 57); Turin, Italy

Coaching information
Previous teams coached
| Years | Teams |
|---|---|
| 1994–1996; 1996–1998; 1998–2001; 2001–2003; 2003–2004; 2004–2005; 2005–2006; 2005–2010; 2007–2008; 2008–2010; 2010–2011; 2010–2015 | CUS Torino Pallavolo (Greece) Olympiacos Piraeus; CUS Torino Pallavolo; Copra Piacenza; Ducato Parma; Lube Banca Macerata; Sempre Volley; Finland (Greece) Panathinaikos Athens; Gabeca Montichiari; Lube Banca Macerata; Italy |
- Last updated: 29 July 2015

Mauro Berruto (born 8 May 1969) is an Italian volleyball head coach.

== Career as coach ==
Born in Turin, Berruto graduated in philosophy and started his career in volley with CUS Torino Pallavolo in 1994. In 2001 he was engaged by Copra Piacenza, which he led to Serie A1, Italy's top volleyball club league, for the first time. After coaching at Parma (2003-2004) and Macerata (2004-2005) in the same league, he became head coach of Finland men's national volleyball team, a position he held until 2010; in 2005-2006 he also coached Sempre Volley Padua in A1. In 2007-2008 he coached Panathinaikos V.C. in Greece, while the following year he returned to Italy's Serie 1 as head coach of Gabeca Montichiari (2008-2010), moving to Lube Macerata in 2010-2011.

In 2010 he was head coach of Italy men's national volleyball team. In 2011 his national team achieved the silver medal in the European Championship. On August 12, 2012 Italy defeated Bulgaria to gain the bronze medal in the 20120 Olympic Games at London. At the World League 2013 his team achieved bronze, while in the same year European Championships he led the Italian team to the second consecutive silver medal in the tournament. At the World League 2014 Italy qualified to the final round, held in Florence, gaining another bronze medal.

Just before the final round of the 2015 World League he sent home four players (Zaytsev, Travica, Sabbi and Randazzo) because of insubordination. After his team took 5th place in the World League finals held in Rio de Janeiro, on July 29, 2015 he resigned as coach of the Italian national team.

== Awards ==
- 2005 CEV Challenge Cup, with Lube Banca Macerata
- 2008 Greek Cup, with Panathinaikos Athens
- 2011 CEV Challenge Cup, with Lube Banca Macerata
- 2011 CEV European Championship
- 2012 Olympic Games
- 2013 FIVB World League
- 2013 CEV European Championship
- 2013 FIVB World Grand Champions Cup
- 2014 FIVB World League
