= Sotirios Pantaleon =

Greek volleyball player (born 1980)

Personal information
- Nationality: Greek
- Born: 21 June 1980 (age 46); Athens, Greece
- Height: 2.02 m (6 ft 8 in)
- Weight: 77 kg (170 lb)
- Spike: 330 cm (130 in)
- Block: 312 cm (123 in)

Career
Years	Teams
1996–2012; 2012; 2012–2013; 2013–2014; 2014–2021	Panathinaikos; Andreoli Latina; Pamvohaikos; AS Cannes; Panathinaikos

National team
Greece (192)

Sotirios Pantaleon (Greek: Σωτήρης Πανταλέων; born 21 June 1980) is a retired Greek male volleyball player. He was part of the Greece men's national volleyball team. He competed with the national team at the 2004 Summer Olympics in Athens, Greece.

== See also ==
- Greece at the 2004 Summer Olympics
