= Athanasios Protopsaltis =

Greek volleyball player (born 1993)

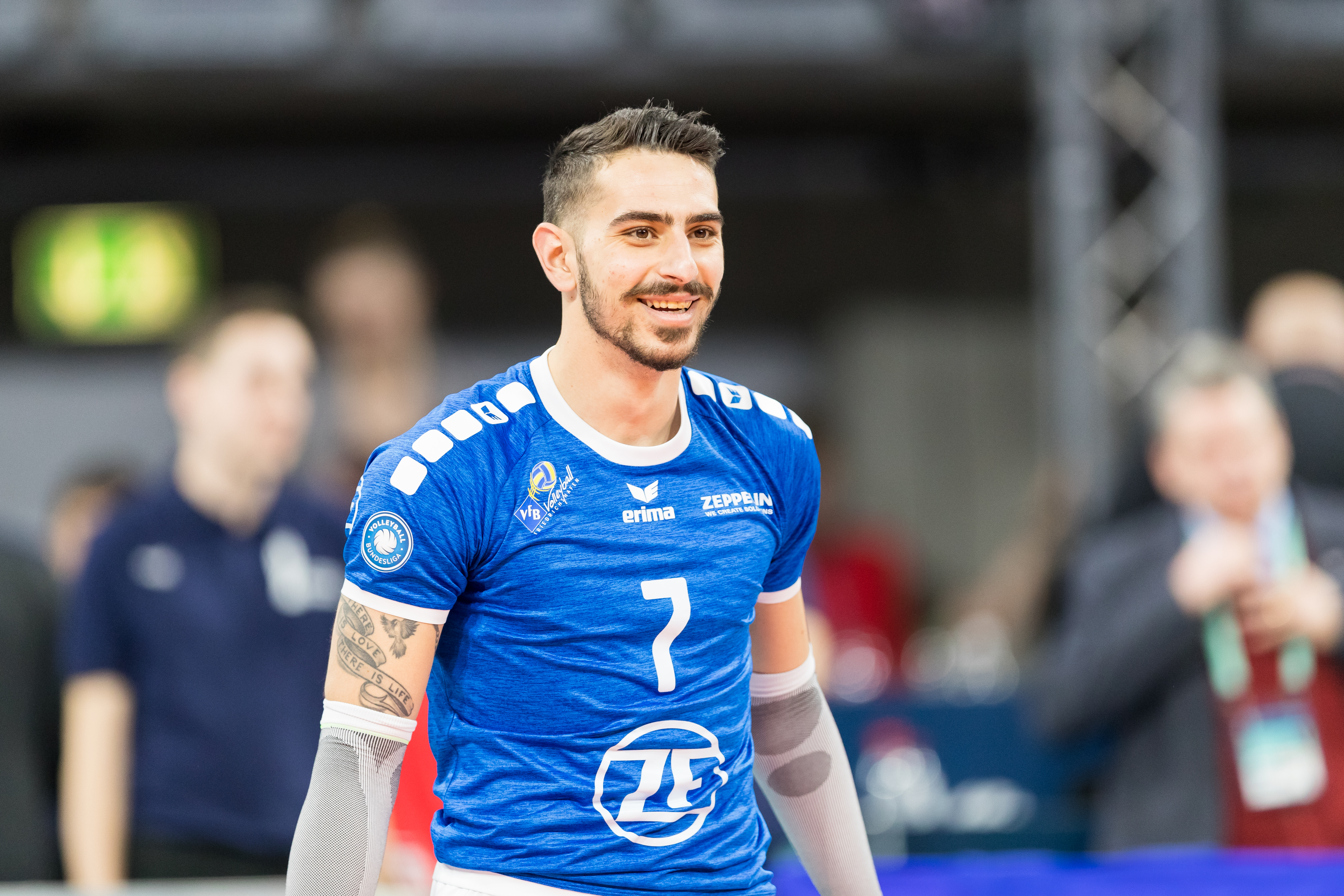

Personal information
- Born: 12 September 1993 (age 33); Limassol, Cyprus
- Height: 1.80 m (5 ft 11 in)
- Weight: 73 kg (161 lb)
- Spike: 340 cm (134 in)
- Block: 325 cm (128 in)

Volleyball information
- Position: Outside hitter
- Current club: Panathinaikos
- Number: 77

Career
Years	Teams
2008–2011; 2011–2013; 2013–2014; 2014–2015; 2015–2016; 2016–2019; 2019–2020; 2020–2021; 2021–2022; 2022–2023; 2023–	Anorthosis Famagusta; Panathinaikos; Kifissia; Panathinaikos; Narbonne Volley; VfB Friedrichshafen; Czarni Radom; Foinikas Syros; Panathinaikos; Greenyard Maaseik; Panathinaikos

National team
2013–	Greece
Honours
Men's volleyball
Representing Greece
European League
Silver medal – second place	2014 Greece/Montenegro

Athanasios Protopsaltis (Greek: Αθανάσιος Πρωτοψάλτης; born 12 September 1993) is a Cypriot-born Greek professional volleyball player who plays as an outside hitter for Panathinaikos and the Greece national team.

== Honours ==
=== Club ===
- Domestic
  - 2009–10 Cypriot Championship, with Anorthosis Famagusta
  - 2010–11 Cypriot Championship, with Anorthosis Famagusta
  - 2015–16 German SuperCup, with VfB Friedrichshafen
  - 2016–17 German Cup, with VfB Friedrichshafen
  - 2016–17 German SuperCup, with VfB Friedrichshafen
  - 2017–18 German Cup, with VfB Friedrichshafen
  - 2017–18 German SuperCup, with VfB Friedrichshafen
  - 2018–19 German Cup, with VfB Friedrichshafen
  - 2021–22 Greek Championship, with Panathinaikos
  - 2021–22 Greek League Cup, with Panathinaikos

=== Individual awards ===
- 2017: German SuperCup – Most valuable player
- 2018: German Championship – Most valuable player
- 2022: Greek League Cup – Most valuable player
- 2022: Greek Championship – Best server
