= Sotiris Amarianakis =

Greek volleyball player (born 1965)

Personal information
- Nationality: Greek
- Born: 13 June 1965 (age 61); Thessaloniki
- Height: 203 cm (6 ft 8 in)

Volleyball information
- Position: Middle Blocker

Career
Years	Teams
1988–1996	(Greece) Olympiacos

National team
Greece
Honours
Men's volleyball
Representing Greece
European Championship
Bronze medal – third place	1987 Ghent	Team competition

Sotiris Amarianakis (born 13 June 1965) is a former Greek male volleyball player. He was part of the Greece men's national volleyball team that won the bronze medal at the 1987 European Championship in Belgium. He played for Greek powerhouse Olympiacos for 8 years (1988–96), winning numerous titles.

== Clubs ==
- (Greece) Esperos Vyzantiou (1980–1985)
- (Greece) PAOK Thessaloniki V.C. (1985–1988)
- (Greece) Olympiacos (1988–1996)
- (Greece) Ktisifon Paianias (1996–1997)
- (Greece) Filia Ilioupolis (1997–1998)
- (Greece) Ionikos Nikaias (1998–2002)
- (Greece) AEK V.C. (2002–2003)
