= Foinikas Syros V.C. =

Greek volleyball club

Foinikas Syros
- Founded: 1980
- Ground: Dimitris Vikelas Arena (Capacity: 700)
- Chairman: Christos Kaftiranis
- Manager: Thanos Terzis
- League: A1 Volleyleague
- 2020–21: 2nd
- Website: Club home page

Uniforms
Home	Away

Foinikas Syros (Greek: Φοίνικας Σύρου) is a professional Greek volleyball club based in the island of Syros. Foinikas plays in the first division of Greek Volleyball Championship (A1 Ethniki Volleyball) and has won 2 national titles, the Greek League Cup at 2012 and 2021. Their home ground is the Dimitris Vikelas Arena in Ermoupolis, Syros and their colours are blue and red.

== History ==
The club was founded in 1980 and its first home was the Foinikas, village in the southwest of Syros. Since 2000, Foinikas plays continually in national divisions. In season 1999-2000 Foinikas was promoted in fourth division of Volleyleague (Gamma Ethniki). The next season, won the rise in third division (Beta Ethniki). After four years, in season 2004-05 was promoted in second division (A2 Ethniki). In season 2008-09 played for first time in first division. Foinikas remained in first division for two years. In season 2009-10 was relegated but returned the next year. As soon as it returned, won the Greek League Cup. At the same season succeeded one more important accolade. It played in the finals of the championship but was beaten by Iraklis Thessaloniki.

== Recent seasons ==
Season	Division	Place	Notes
2000–01	Gamma Ethniki		Promoted to Beta Ethniki
2001–02	Beta Ethniki		
2002–03	Beta Ethniki		
2003–04	Beta Ethniki		
2004–05	Beta Ethniki		Promoted to A2 Ethniki
2005–06	A2 Ethniki	3rd	
2006–07	A2 Ethniki	3rd	
2007–08	A2 Ethniki	2nd	Promoted to A1 Ethniki
2008–09	A1 Ethniki	5th	
2009–10	A1 Ethniki	12th	Relegated to A2 Ethniki
2010–11	A2 Ethniki	1st	Promoted to A1 Ethniki
2011–12	A1 Ethniki	2nd	Winner League Cup
2012–13	A1 Ethniki	5th	
2013–14	A1 Ethniki	4th	
2014–15	A1 Ethniki	3rd	
2015–16	A1 Ethniki	2nd	
2016–17	A1 Ethniki	6th	
2017–18	A1 Ethniki	3rd	
2018–19	A1 Ethniki	3rd	
2019–20	A1 Ethniki	4th	
2020–21	A1 Ethniki	2nd	Winner League Cup
2021–22	A1 Ethniki	3rd	Winner Super Cup

== Honours ==
- Greek Volleyball Championship
  - Finalist (3): 2011–12, 2015–16, 2020–21
- Greek Volleyball League Cup
  - Winner (2): 2012, 2021
  - Finalist (2): 2014, 2019
- Greek Volleyball Super Cup
  - Winner (1): 2021

== Current squad ==
2020–2021 roster

Number	Player	Position	Height (m)	Birth Date
1	(Slovakia) Peter Michalovič	Opposite	2.00	May 26, 1990 (age 34)
2	(Greece) Georgios Papalexiou	Middle blocker	2.02	August 28, 1999 (age 25)
3	(Greece) Dimitris Pochanis	Opposite	2.00	July 28, 1997 (age 27)
4	(Greece) Dimitris Konstantinidis	Libero	1.88	August 5, 1993 (age 31)
5	(Cuba) Raydel Hierrezuelo	Setter	1.96	July 14, 1987 (age 37)
6	(Brazil) Deivid Júnior Costa	Middle blocker	2.06	April 26, 1998 (age 26)
7	(Greece) Kostas Kapetanidis	Outside hitter	1.95	March 24, 1999 (age 25)
8	(Greece) Ilias Theodosis	Setter	1.90	May 20, 1995 (age 29)
9	(Greece) Nikos Papaggelopoulos	Middle blocker	2.02	November 17, 1988 (age 36)
10	(Greece) Markos Galiotos	Setter	1.95	August 23, 1996 (age 28)
12	(Greece) Mitar Tzourits	Middle blocker	2.11	April 25, 1989 (age 35)
13	(Greece) Andreas Frangos (c)	Outside hitter	2.01	December 21, 1989 (age 35)
14	(Slovenia) Žiga Štern	Outside hitter	1.93	January 2, 1994 (age 31)
15	(Greece) Vasilis Karasavvidis	Libero	1.96	March 17, 1995 (age 30)
17	(Greece) Panagiotis Papadopoulos	Outside hitter	1.98	April 30, 1992 (age 32)
18	(Greece) Nikos Milis	Opposite	1.97	November 4, 1996 (age 28)

=== Technical and managerial staff ===
Job	Name
Head coach	(Greece) Joško Milenkoski
Assistant coach	(Italy) Luigi Parisi

== Notable players ==
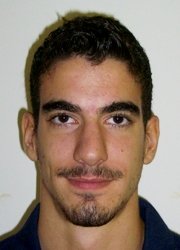
Andreas Frangos

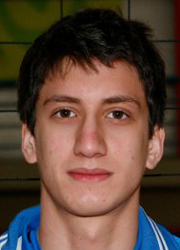
Panagiotis Pelekoudas

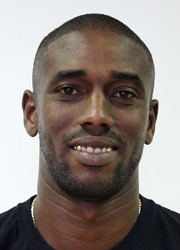
Raydel Hierrezuelo

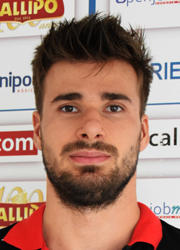
Peter Michalovič

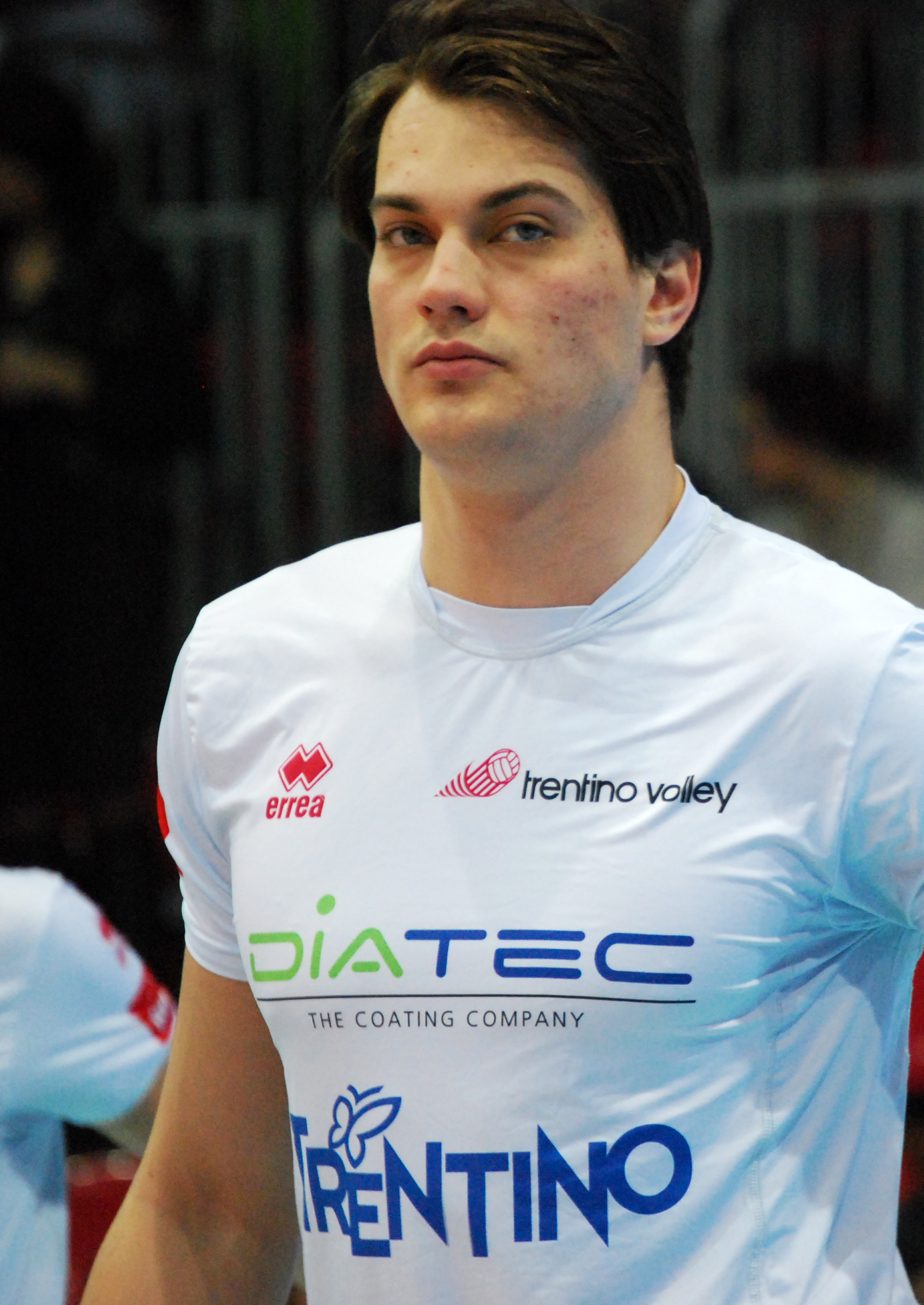
Mitar Tzourits

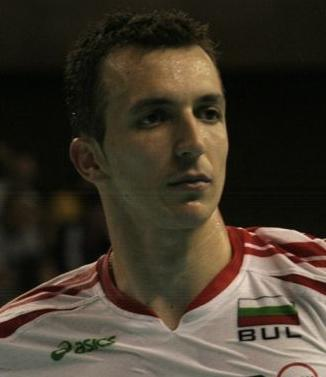
Boyan Yordanov

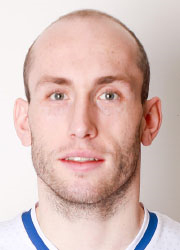
Žiga Štern

(Players are listed in alphabetical order)

Greece

- Andreas Andreadis
- Andreas Frangos
- Vasilis Kournetas
- Ilias Lappas
- Athanasios Maroulis
- Athanasios Protopsaltis
- Panagiotis Pelekoudas
- Nikolaos Smaragdis
- Dimitrios Soultanopoulos
- Mitar Tzourits
- Theodoros Voulkidis

Brazil

- Pedro Azenha
- Leonardo Caldeira
- Deivid Júnior Costa
- Murilo Radke

Bulgaria

- Boyan Yordanov

Cuba

- Raydel Hierrezuelo

Serbia

- Tomislav Dokić
- Nikola Mijailović

Slovakia

- Peter Michalovič

Slovenia

- Žiga Štern

== Sponsorships ==
- Great Sponsors: ONEX Neorion Shipyards, Blue Star Ferries, City Insurance
