= 2015 FIVB Volleyball Women's World Cup – South American Qualification =

2015 FIVB the World Cup Qualifier for South American
Tournament details
- Host country: Argentina
- Dates: 3 – 7 June
- Teams: 5
- Venue: 1 (in 1 host city)

Final positions
- Champions: Argentina (1st title)

Tournament awards
- MVP: (Argentina) Yamila Nizetich

The tournament which will be held for qualification process for the 2015 FIVB Volleyball Women's World Cup in Japan. The tournament will be played from June 1 to June 7 in Comodoro Rivadavia, Argentina. The top two teams will qualify for the 2015 FIVB Volleyball Women's World Cup.

== Participated teams ==
- Argentina (host)
- Chile
- Colombia
- Peru
- Uruguay

== Venues ==
Comodoro Rivadavia, Argentina
Estadio Socios Fundadores
Capacity: 2,276
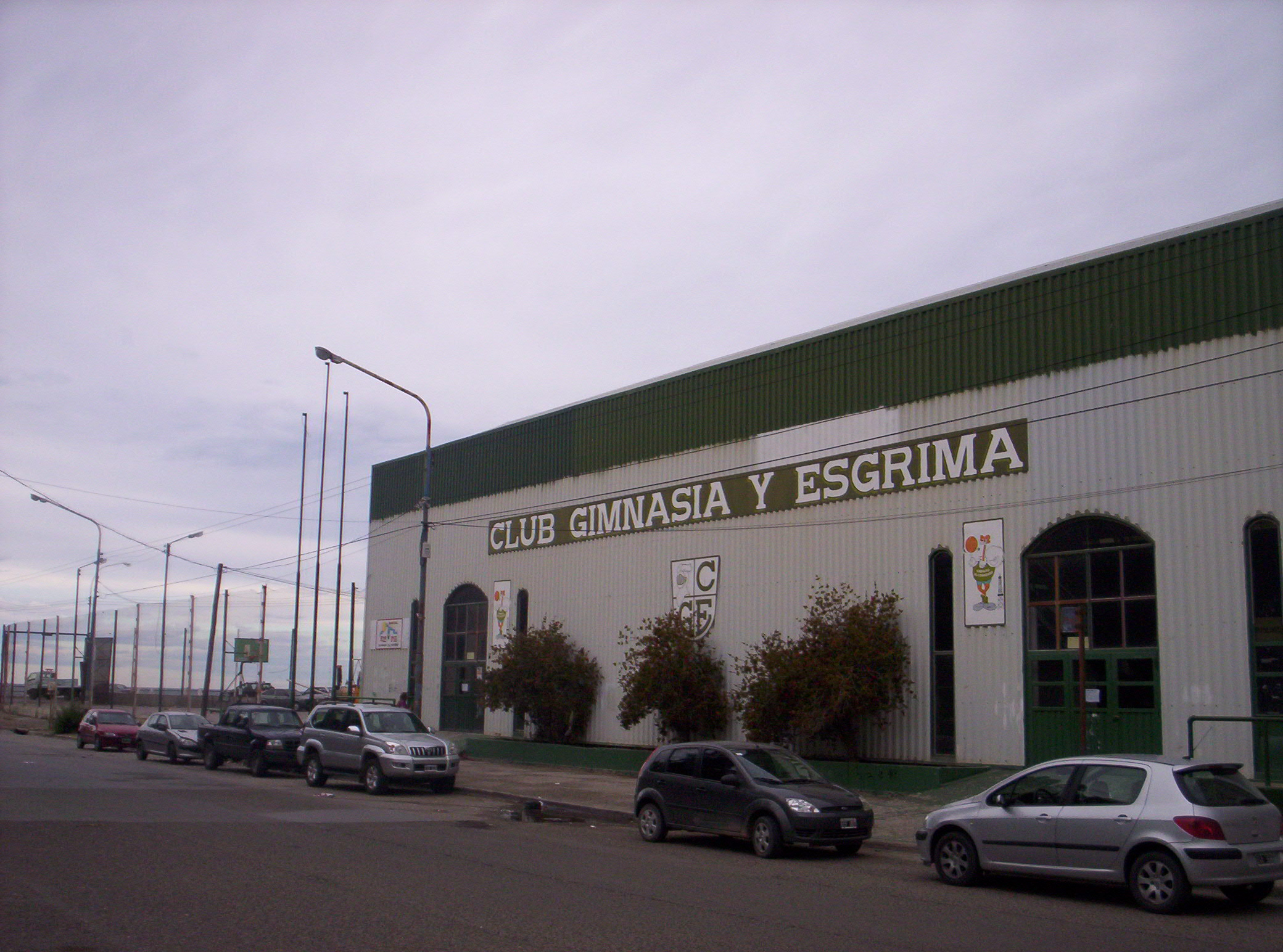

== Pool standing procedure ==
1. Numbers of matches won
2. Match points
3. Sets ratio
4. Points ratio
5. Result of the last match between the tied teams

Match won 3–0 or 3–1: 3 match points for the winner, 0 match points for the loser
Match won 3–2: 2 match points for the winner, 1 match point for the loser

== Results ==
- All times are ART (UTC−03:00).

Pos	Team	Pld	W	L	Pts	SW	SL	SR	SPW	SPL	SPR
1	Argentina	4	4	0	11	12	2	6.000	329	234	1.406
2	Peru	4	3	1	9	11	5	2.200	361	296	1.220
3	Colombia	4	2	2	7	8	6	1.333	314	284	1.106
4	Uruguay	4	1	3	2	3	11	0.273	247	329	0.751
5	Chile	4	0	4	1	2	12	0.167	235	324	0.725

Date	Time		Score		Set 1	Set 2	Set 3	Set 4	Set 5	Total	Report
3 June	17:00	Colombia	3–0	Chile	25–16	25–20	25–21			75–57	Report
3 June	21:00	Uruguay	0–3	Argentina	18–25	12–25	14–25			44–75	Report
4 June	18:00	Peru	3–0	Uruguay	25–16	25–14	25–19			75–49	Report
4 June	21:00	Chile	0–3	Argentina	5–25	16–25	13–25			34–75	Report
5 June	18:00	Peru	3–2	Colombia	21–25	27–25	25–17	19–25	15–11	107–103	Report
5 June	21:00	Uruguay	3–2	Chile	18–25	25–19	23–25	25–19	18–16	109–104	Report
6 June	17:00	Chile	0–3	Peru	14–25	13–25	13–25			40–75	Report
6 June	20:00	Argentina	3–0	Colombia	25–11	25–18	25–22			75–51	Report
7 June	17:00	Colombia	3–0	Uruguay	25–14	25–19	25–12			75–45	Report
7 June	20:00	Argentina	3–2	Peru	25–22	18–25	25–23	21–25	15–9	104–104	Report

== Final standing ==
Rank	Team
1st place, gold medalist(s)	Argentina
2nd place, silver medalist(s)	Peru
3rd place, bronze medalist(s)	Colombia
4	Uruguay
5	Chile

Qualified for the 2015 FIVB Volleyball Women's World Cup

2015 South American World Cup Qualifier

Argentina
1st title

== Awards ==
- Most valuable player
  (Argentina) Yamila Nizetich
- Best setter
  (Peru) Zoila La Rosa
- Best outside spiker
  (Peru) Maguilaura Frias
  (Uruguay) LucÍa Guigou
- Best middle blocker
  (Argentina) Emilce Sosa
  (Colombia) Yeisy Soto
- Best opposite spiker
  (Peru) Ángela Leyva
- Best libero
  (Argentina) Tatiana Rizzo

== See also ==
- 2015 FIVB Volleyball Men's World Cup – South American Qualification
