= Žiga Štern =

Slovenian volleyball player (born 1994)

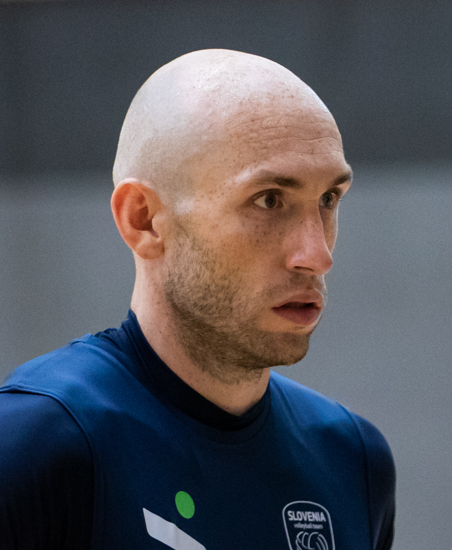
- Štern in 2022

Personal information
- Born: 2 January 1994 (age 32) Maribor, Slovenia
- Height: 1.93 m (6 ft 4 in)
- Weight: 86 kg (190 lb)
- Spike: 345 cm (136 in)
- Block: 328 cm (129 in)

Volleyball information
- Position: Outside hitter
- Current club: VC Yenisey Krasnoyarsk

Career
- Years: Team
- 2013–2016 2016–2017 2017 2018 2018 2018–2019 2019–2022 2022–2023 2023–2024 2024–2025 2025–: Calcit Kamnik; ACH Volley; Tours VB; Stade Poitevin Poitiers; Jeopark Kula Belediyespor; Top Volley Latina; Foinikas Syros; VfB Friedrichshafen; Ślepsk Suwałki; Skra Bełchatów; VC Yenisey Krasnoyarsk

National team
- Years: Team
- 2015–: Slovenia
Honours
Men's volleyball
Representing Slovenia
FIVB Challenger Cup
Gold medal – first place	2019 Slovenia
CEV European Championship
Silver medal – second place	2019 France/Slovenia/Belgium/Netherlands
Silver medal – second place	2021 Poland/Czech Republic/Estonia/Finland
Bronze medal – third place	2023 Italy/Bulgaria/North Macedonia/Israel

Žiga Štern (born 2 January 1994) is a Slovenian professional volleyball player who plays as an outside hitter for VC Yenisey Krasnoyarsk and the Slovenia national team. With Slovenia, Štern competed in the European Championship in 2019 and 2021, where the team finished as runners-up on both occasions. He also represented Slovenia at the 2024 Summer Olympics.

== Honours ==
=== Club ===
- Domestic
  - 2015–16 Slovenian Cup, with Calcit Kamnik
  - 2016–17 Slovenian Championship, with ACH Volley
  - 2020–21 Greek League Cup, with Foinikas Syros
  - 2021–22 Greek SuperCup, with Foinikas Syros
