= Liberman Agámez =

Colombian volleyball player (born 1985)

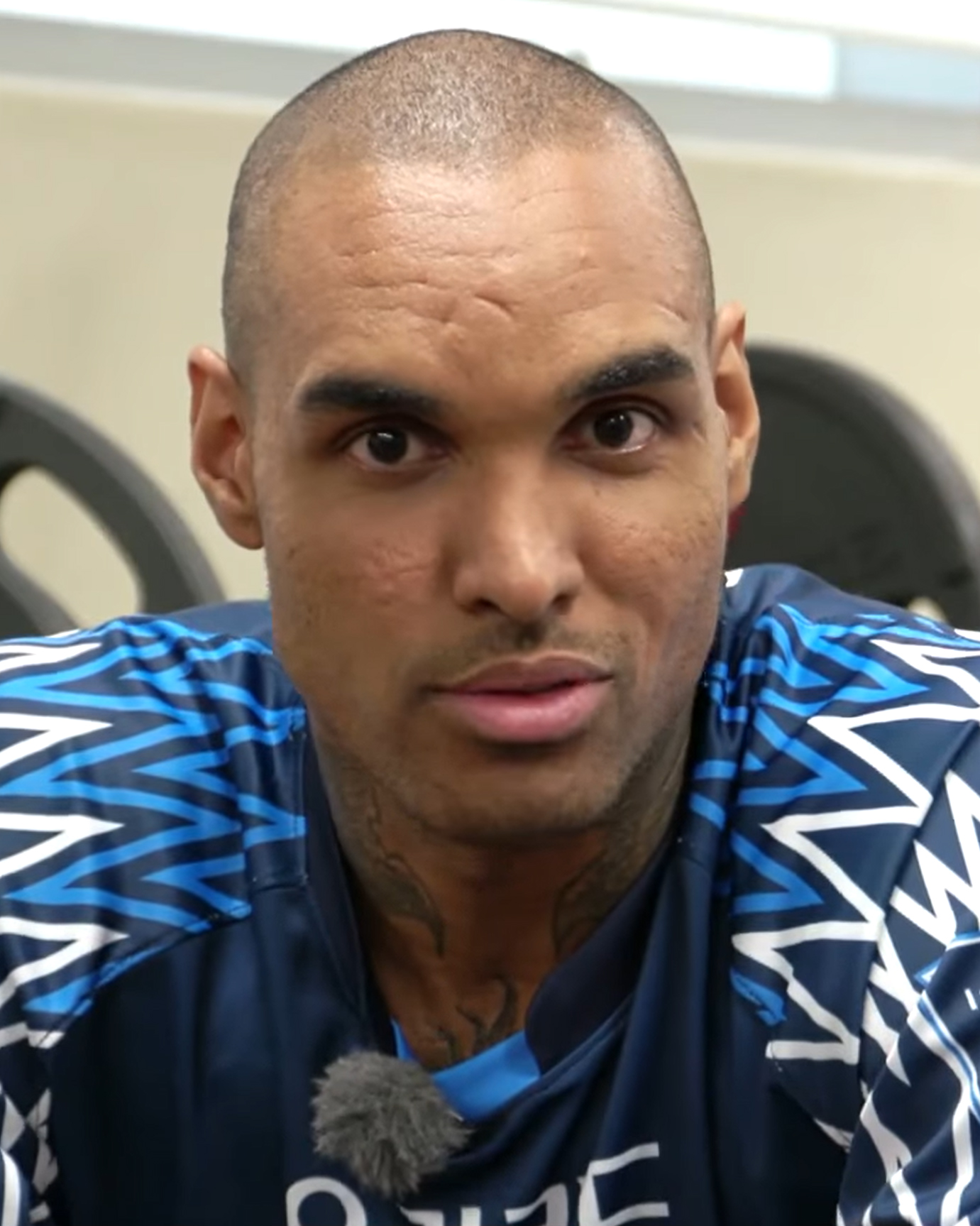
- Agámez in 2018

Personal information
- Full name: Liberman Agámez Urango
- Nationality: Colombian
- Born: 15 February 1985 (age 41); Apartadó, Antioquia, Colombia
- Hometown: Apartadó
- Height: 208 cm (6 ft 10 in)
- Weight: 95 kg (209 lb)
- Spike: 377 cm (148 in)
- Block: 355 cm (140 in)

Volleyball information
- Position: Winger/spiker

Career
| Years | Teams |
|---|---|
| 2004–2005 | Ionikos Nea Filadelfeia |
| 2005 | Pagrati Athens |
| 2005–2010 | Panathinaikos Athens |
| 2010–2013 | Arkas Spor |
| 2013–2014 | Cheonan Skywalkers |
| 2015–2016 | Galatasaray |
| 2016–2017 | Olympiacos Piraeus |
| 2017–2018 | Paykan Tehran |
| 2018 | Sporting CP |
| 2018–2019 | Seoul Woori Card |
| 2019–2020 | Guangdong Shenzhen |
| 2020 | Al-Seeb |
| 2020–2021 | Al-Ain |
| 2021 | Hatta Club |
| 2021– | Shabab Al Ahli |

National team
| 2005–2015 | Colombia |

Liberman Cristhofer Agámez Urango (born 15 February 1985) is a Colombian volleyball player. He was member of the Colombia men's national volleyball team (2005–2015).

In 2017, he signed a contract with Sporting.

== Sporting achievements ==
=== National team ===
South American Volleyball Championship:

  - 2013, 2015

=== Club ===
==== International competitions ====
- 2008/2009 CEV Cup, with Panathinaikos(runner-up)

==== National championships ====
- 2005/2006 Greek Championship, with Panathinaikos
- 2012/2013 Turkish Championship, with Arkas Spor

==== National Cups ====
- 2006/2007 Greek Cup, with Panathinaikos
- 2007/2008 Greek Cup, with Panathinaikos
- 2009/2010 Greek Cup, with Panathinaikos
- 2010/2011 Turkish Cup, with Arkas Spor
- 2016/2017 Greek Cup, with Olympiacos

==== National League Cups ====
- 2016/2017 Greek League Cup, with Olympiacos Piraeus

== Awards ==
=== Individuals ===
- 2008 Greek Cup "Most Valuable Player"
- 2009 CEV Cup "Most Valuable Player"
- 2009 CEV Cup "Best Scorer"
- 2011 CEV Challenge Cup "Most Valuable Player"
- 2011 CEV Challenge Cup "Best Scorer"
- 2010 Greek Cup "Most Valuable Player"
- 2011 Turkish League "Best Scorer"
- 2012 Turkish League "Best Scorer"
- 2012 Memorial Zdzisław Ambroziak "Best Spiker"
- 2013 Turkish League "Most Valuable Player"
- 2013 Turkish League "Best Scorer"
- 2015 FIVB World Cup – South American Qualification "Most Valuable Player"
- 2017 Greek Cup "Most Valuable Player"
- 2021 Men's South American Volleyball Championship "Best Spiker"
