= 2015 FIVB Volleyball Men's World Cup – South American Qualification =

Qualification tournament held in Columbia in May 2015

2015 FIVB the World Cup Qualifier for South American
Tournament details
- Host country: Colombia
- Dates: 19–23 May
- Teams: 4
- Venue: 1 (in 1 host city)

Final positions
- Champions: Argentina (1st title)

Tournament awards
- MVP: (Colombia) Liberman Agamez

The South American qualification tournament for the 2015 FIVB Volleyball Men's World Cup was held in Cali, Colombia from 19 to 23 May 2015. The top two teams qualified for the 2015 World Cup.

== Teams ==
- Colombia (Hosts)
- Argentina
- Chile
- Venezuela

== Venue ==
Cali, Colombia
Coliseo Evangelista Mora
Capacity: 3,340
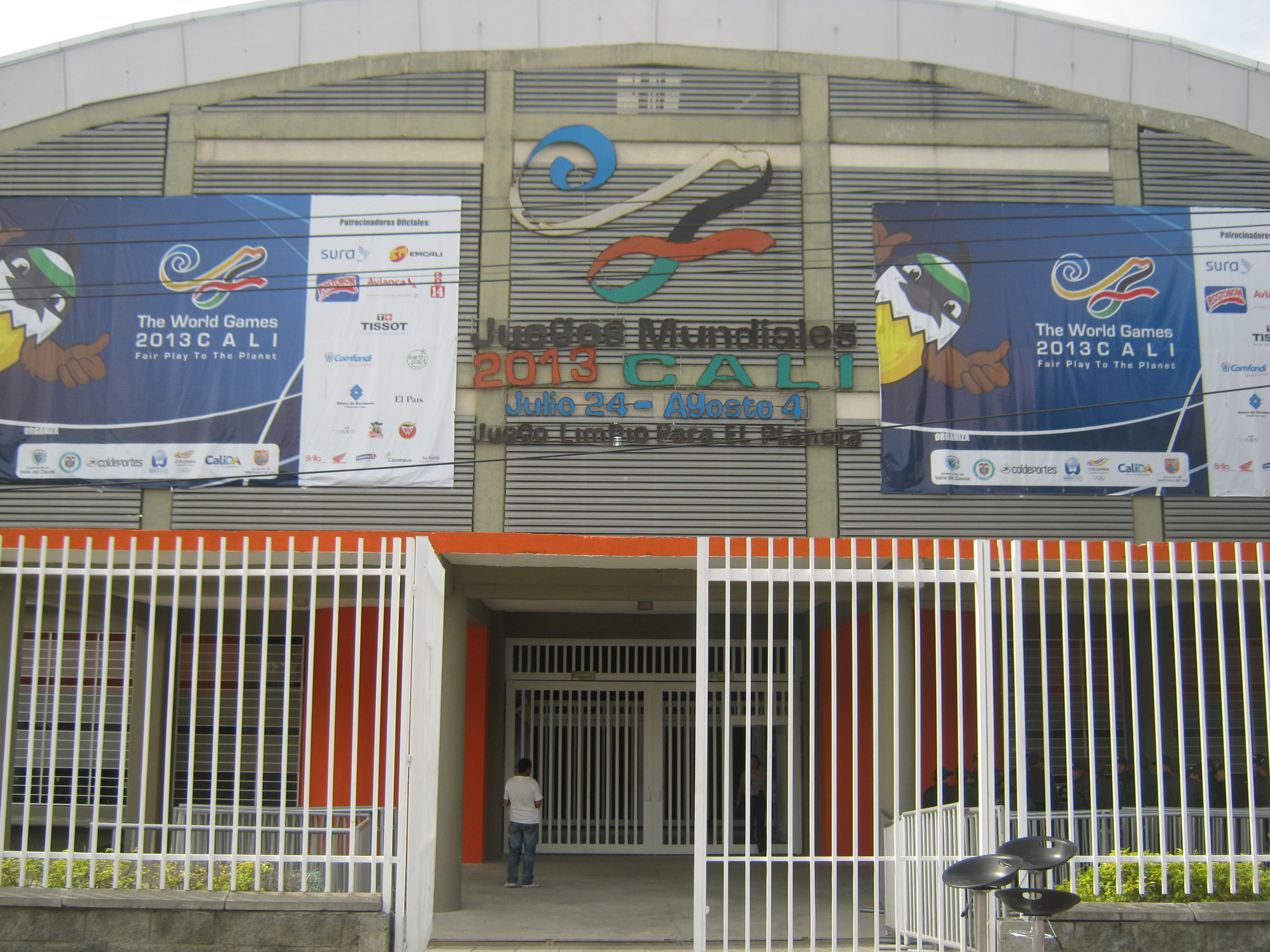

== Pool standing procedure ==
1. Number of matches won
2. Match points
3. Sets ratio
4. Points ratio
5. Result of the last match between the tied teams

Match won 3–0 or 3–1: 3 match points for the winner, 0 match points for the loser
Match won 3–2: 2 match points for the winner, 1 match point for the loser

== Preliminary round ==
- All times are Colombia Time (UTC−05:00).

Pos	Team	Pld	W	L	Pts	SW	SL	SR	SPW	SPL	SPR	Qualification
1	Argentina	3	3	0	9	9	0	MAX	226	155	1.458	Semifinals
2	Venezuela	3	2	1	6	6	5	1.200	242	261	0.927	Semifinals
3	Chile	3	1	2	3	4	6	0.667	237	224	1.058	Semifinals
4	Colombia	3	0	3	0	1	9	0.111	180	245	0.735	Semifinals

Date	Time		Score		Set 1	Set 2	Set 3	Set 4	Set 5	Total	Report
19 May	18:00	Argentina	3–0	Venezuela	25–14	25–16	25–20			75–50	Report
19 May	20:15	Colombia	0–3	Chile	17–25	16–25	18–25			51–75	Report
20 May	18:00	Argentina	3–0	Chile	26–24	25–23	25–14			76–61	Report
20 May	20:15	Venezuela	3–1	Colombia	25–20	20–25	25–20	25–20		95–85	Report
21 May	18:00	Chile	1–3	Venezuela	26–28	23–25	25–15	27–29		101–97	Report
21 May	20:15	Colombia	0–3	Argentina	13–25	12–25	19–25			44–75	Report

== Final round ==
- All times are Colombia Time (UTC−05:00).

Semifinals
22 May
Venezuela	3
Chile	0
22 May
Argentina	3
Colombia	0

Final
23 May
Venezuela	2
Argentina	3
3rd place match
23 May
Chile	3
Colombia	0

=== Semifinals ===
Date	Time		Score		Set 1	Set 2	Set 3	Set 4	Set 5	Total	Report
22 May	18:00	Venezuela	3–0	Chile	25–21	25–23	26–24			76–68	Report
22 May	20:15	Argentina	3–0	Colombia	25–16	25–23	26–24			76–63	Report

=== 3rd place match ===
Date	Time		Score		Set 1	Set 2	Set 3	Set 4	Set 5	Total	Report
23 May	16:30	Chile	3–0	Colombia	28–26	25–22	28–26			81–74	Report

=== Final ===
Date	Time		Score		Set 1	Set 2	Set 3	Set 4	Set 5	Total	Report
23 May	19:00	Venezuela	2–3	Argentina	24–26	25–23	22–25	25–23	19–21	115–118	Report

== Final standing ==
Rank	Team
1st place, gold medalist(s)	Argentina
2nd place, silver medalist(s)	Venezuela
3rd place, bronze medalist(s)	Chile
4	Colombia

Qualified for the 2015 World Cup

2015 Men's South American World Cup Qualifier

Argentina
1st title

== Awards ==
- Most valuable player
  (Colombia) Liberman Agamez
- Best setter
  (Argentina) Luciano De Cecco
- Best outside spikers
  (Chile) Vicente Parraguirre
  (Argentina) Nicolás Bruno
- Best middle blockers
  (Argentina) Pablo Crer
  (Venezuela) Iván Márquez
- Best opposite spiker
  (Argentina) Federico Martina
- Best libero
  (Argentina) Facundo Santucci

== See also ==
- 2015 FIVB Volleyball Women's World Cup – South American Qualification
