= Celso Brum Junior =

Brazilian volleyball player (born 1978)

Celso

Personal information
- Full name: Celso Brum Junior
- Born: 22 July 1978 (age 48); Curitiba, Brazil
- Height: 2.02 m (6 ft 8 in)

Volleyball information
- Position: Opposite / Receiver-Attacker

Career
Years	Teams
1990-2004; 1996-1997; 1997-1998; 1998-1999; 1999-2000; 2000-2001; 2001-2002; 2002-2003; 2003-2004; 2004-2005; 2005-2006; 2006-2007; 2007-2007	Col.Pe.Joao Bagozzi; Tijuca Tenis Clube; Fluminense FC; Bento Gonçalves; Intelbrás São José; Esmoriz Ginásio Clube; UNEB; UCS / Esse-ti Loreto; AEK Athens V.C. UCS / Al Arabi; Marcohim Mariupol; Busaiteen Club; Famigliulo Coriglian / UCS

National team
Brazil

Celso Brum Junior (born 22 July 1978 in Curitiba) is a retired volleyball player from Brazil. After playing professional volleyball for more than a decade, he ended his career due to injuries. He has a strong spike, he is known by his friends as "braço doido" (crazy arm).

Celso is married and lives with his wife and son in Southern Brazil.
