= Aleksandar Simeonov (volleyball) =

Bulgarian volleyball player

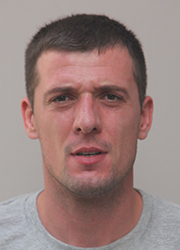

Personal information
- Nationality: Bulgarian
- Born: January 6, 1986 (age 40); Sofia
- Height: 198 cm (6 ft 6 in)
- Weight: 89 kg (196 lb)
- Spike: 340 cm (134 in)
- Block: 320 cm (126 in)

Volleyball information
- Position: Outside spiker
- Current club: (Bulgaria) CSKA Sofia

Career
Years	Teams
2003-2010; 2010-2011; 2011-2012; 2012-2013; 2013-2014; 2014; 2015; 2015-2016; 2016; 2016-2017; 2017-2018; 2018; 2019-2020; 2020-2022; 2022-2023; 2023; 2024-present	(Bulgaria) Levski Sofia (Russia) Yaroslavich Yaroslavl (Iran) Saipa Alborz (Belarus) Shakhtyor Soligorsk VC (Iran) Shahrdari Gonbad VC (Bulgaria) Levski Sofia (Austria) SK Posojilnica Aich/Dob (Greece) Panathinaikos V.C. (Switzerland) PV Lugano (Bulgaria) Montana Volley (Italy) Pallavolo Aversa (Bulgaria) Neftohimic 2010 Burgas (Bulgaria) Hebar Pazardzhik VC (Bulgaria) VC Pirin Razlog (Bulgaria) CSKA Sofia (Bulgaria) Cherno More (Bulgaria) CSKA Sofia

Aleksandar Simeonov (born January 6, 1986) is a Bulgarian volleyball player, a member of the club CSKA Sofia.

== Sporting achievements ==
=== Clubs ===
Bulgarian Championship:

- 2004, 2005, 2006, 2009
- 2007, 2019
- 2010, 2014, 2017

Bulgarian Cup:

- 2004, 2006, 2019

Iranian Championship:

- 2012

Belarusian Championship:

- 2013

MEVZA:

- 2015

Austrian Championship:

- 2015
