= AEK V.C. =

Greek volleyball club

AEK
- Full name: AEK Men's Volleyball Club
- Nickname: Énosis (Union); Kitrinómavri (The Yellow-Blacks); Vasílissa (Queen); AEK tis Kardiás (AEK of Heart)
- Founded: 1982
- Ground: Apostolos Kontos Nea Filadelfeia Indoor Hall (Capacity: 400)
- Chairman: Alexis Alexiou
- Manager: Giorgos Mantzios
- League: A2 Ethniki
- 2025–26: A2 Ethniki, 2nd
- Website: Club home page

Uniforms
Home	Away

AEK Men's Volleyball Club is the men's volleyball team of the major Greek multi-sports club AEK. It was founded in 1982. AEK had their finest moment with coach Stelios Prosalikas when they reached the final four of the Cup Winners' Cup in 2000 (achieving the 3rd position). The matches were held on 9 and 10 March in Athens; AEK were beaten in the semi-final by Cuneo, but beat Galatasaray 3-1 in the 3rd place game.

== History ==
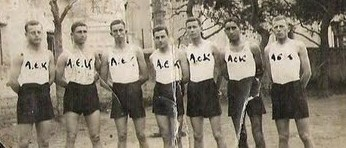
The volleyball team of 1932

The men's volleyball department of AEK was originally founded in the 1930s, but soon it was disbanded and reopened in 1967 by Jason Platsi. It then participated in the third category of Athens. Nevertheless, it was not maintained and was reconstituted in 1982 to participate again in the third category of Athens. Between 1985–86 the club participated in the second division and won promotion to the 1986–87 local first division.

From 1987–88, the club was struggling in the lower national categories. The club remained in the lower national divisions for four years until it won the 1990–91 championship with a record of twenty-two victories. The next year AEK participated in the second Athens division and gained promotion to the third national division.

During the 1992–93 season, AEK participated for the first time in the A2 and missed promotion to the first national category against PAOK. Nonetheless, the club won promotion to the A1 the next year with a record of nineteen victories.

The initial presence of the club in the top volleyball national category (1994–95) was unsuccessful and the club was relegated after recording only three wins.

The second half of the 90s until the beginning of the new millennium was the best year for black and yellow volleyball. The group not only participated in the A1 division but also won a ticket for the 1998–99 European Cup occupying the fifth position. It also reached the cup final and lost against Olympiacos with a 3–1 score.

In 2000, AEK with coach Stelios Prosalikas reached its peak after participating in the Cup Winners Cup final four. The games were held in March 2000 in Athens. AEK lost in the semifinal to Cuneo but won 3–1 against Galatasaray in the consolation final winning the bronze medal.

Unfortunately, since the downturn began in the 2001–02 year, the team was relegated to A2. The last official match was in Georgios Moschos Indoor Hall, AEK defeating Pangrati and celebrating the championship and return to the A1. But the team was not able to stay in the great division and was relegated again. The last two years the group fought at A2, won the Championship in 2005–06, and from 2006–07 returned to A1. In 2013-14, AEK played in A1 Ethniki and finished the championship in 7th place. During this season, AEK also managed to win the first domestic cup title in the men's team's history. More specifically, AEK beat Foinikas Sirou 3–2 in the final of the third Greek League Cup, after having defeated in the semi-final the big favorite and host of the final-four tournament Ethnikos Alexandroupolis (0–3).

In March 2023, the club won the second national division for the sixth time and returned to the A1.

In September 2023, due to a lack of financial resources AEK withdrew from A1 and didn't participate. In September 2024 Alexis Alexiou issued a different club which started from Beta Ethniki.

== Season to season ==
AEK has played 14 times in A1 Ethniki (first division). They played in A1, in season 1994–95 for the first time. From 1996–97 to 2001–02 was playing continuously in A1. The last years were going up and down the divisions.

Season	Division	Place	Notes
1990–91	Gamma Ethniki		promoted to Beta
1991–92	Beta Ethniki		promoted to A2
1992–93	A2 Ethniki	2nd	
1993–94	A2 Ethniki	1st	promoted to A1
1994–95	A1 Ethniki	11th	relegated to A2
1995–96	A2 Ethniki	2nd	promoted to A1
1996–97	A1 Ethniki	5th	
1997–98	A1 Ethniki	5th	
1998–99	A1 Ethniki	6th	Greek Cup Finalists
1999–00	A1 Ethniki	6th	
2000–01	A1 Ethniki	8th	
2001–02	A1 Ethniki	11th	relegated to A2
2002–03	A2 Ethniki	1st	promoted to A1
2003–04	A1 Ethniki	12th	relegated to A2
2004–05	A2 Ethniki	7th	

Season	Division	Place	Notes
2005–06	A2 Ethniki	1st	promoted to A1
2006–07	A1 Ethniki	7th	
2007–08	A1 Ethniki	11th	relegated to A2
2008–09	A2 Ethniki	1st	promoted to A1
2009–10	A1 Ethniki	11th	relegated to A2
2010–11	A2 Ethniki	11th	relegated to Beta
2011–12	Beta Ethniki	1st	promoted to A2
2012–13	A2 Ethniki	1st	promoted to A1
2013–14	A1 Ethniki	7th	League Cup Winners
2014–15	A1 Ethniki	12th	relegated to A2
2015–16	A2 Ethniki	3rd	
2016–17	A2 Ethniki	3rd	
2017–18	A2 Ethniki	1st	promoted to A1
2018–19	A1 Ethniki	8th	
2019–20	inactive		
2020-21	Pre League	canceled	
2021-22	Pre League	6th	
2022-23	Pre League	1st	promoted to A1 later withdrew
2023-24	inactive		
2024-25	Beta Ethniki	1st	promoted to A2 via play-off
2025-26	A2 Ethniki	2nd	lost play-off final

== Honours ==
AEK V.C. honours aek.gr
Type	Competition	Titles	Winners	Runners-up	Third place	Ref.
Continental	CEV Cup	0			1999–00	
Domestic	Greek A2 Volleyball League	6	1993–94, 2002–03, 2005–06, 2008–09, 2012–13, 2017–18	1992–93, 1995–96, 2015–16, 2016–17		
Domestic	Pre League	1	2022–23			
Domestic	Beta Ethniki	3	1991–92, 2011–12 , 2024–25			
Domestic	Gamma Ethniki	1	1990–91			
Domestic	Greek Volleyball Cup	0		1998–99		
Domestic	Greek Volleyball League Cup	1	2013–14			

- record
- ^{S} Shared record

== European performance ==
Season	Achievement	Notes
CEV Cup
1999–00	Final Four	3rd place. Lost 1–3 to Alpitour Traco Cuneo in the semi-final, won 3–0 against Galatasaray S.K. in the 3rd place game

== Team ==
Season 2022–2023

Shirt No	Nationality	Player	Birth Date	Height (m)	Position
2	Greece	Alexandros Polychroniadis	July 2, 1988 (age 37)	1.89	Libero
3	Venezuela	Eduard Ramos	September 13, 1997 (age 28)	2.00	Opposite
4	Greece	Nikos Melles	January 20, 1995 (age 31)	2.00	Middle blocker
5	Greece	Vasilis Konidis	March 23, 2004 (age 22)	1.94	Outside hitter
6	Brazil	Bruno Fyllipe Amorim	January 23, 1996 (age 30)	1.99	Middle blocker
8	Greece	Nikos Kavarinos	December 22, 2004 (age 21)	1.95	Outside hitter
9	Greece	Nikos Kaounis	February 12, 2003 (age 23)	1.83	Outside hitter
10	Greece	Lykourgos Roussis	November 9, 1988 (age 37)	1.87	Setter
11	Greece	Giannis Achilleopoulos	June 26, 1989 (age 37)	1.80	Libero
12	Greece	Nikos Iliakopoulos	February 4, 2001 (age 25)	1.97	Setter
13	Greece	Nikos Palentzas	May 6, 1991 (age 35)	1.99	Opposite
14	Greece	Spyros Barbounis	August 1, 2000 (age 25)	1.89	Outside hitter
15	Greece	Angelos Chalilis	January 28, 2005 (age 21)	1.97	Middle blocker
16	Greece	Ektoras Kamarinopoulos	June 4, 2005 (age 21)	2.08	Middle blocker
17	Brazil	Henrique Batagim	August 1, 1993 (age 32)	2.01	Outside hitter
20	Greece	Nikos Mantzios	February 26, 2007 (age 19)	1.78	Setter

=== Technical and managerial staff ===
Job	Name
Manager	(Greece) Akis Chatziantoniou
Assistant	(Greece) Georgios Mantzios
Physiotherapist	(Greece) Stavros Toilos
Caregiver	(Greece) Georgios Siomos
Fitness coach	(Greece) Panagiotis Adamopoulos

== Notable coaches ==
- Dimitris Kazazis
- Stelios Prosalikas
- Akis Flaounas
- Zoran Gajić
- Jorge Elgueta

== List of former players ==
Criteria

To appear in this section a player must have either:

- Played at least one season for the club.
- Set a club record or won an individual award while at the club.
- Played at least one official international match for their national team at any time.
- Performed successfully during his period in the club or at later/previous stages of his career.

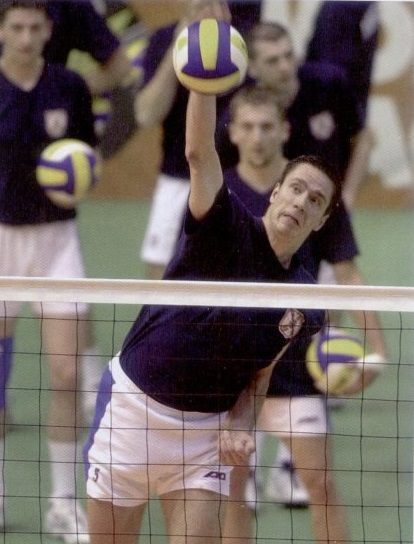
Edin Škorić

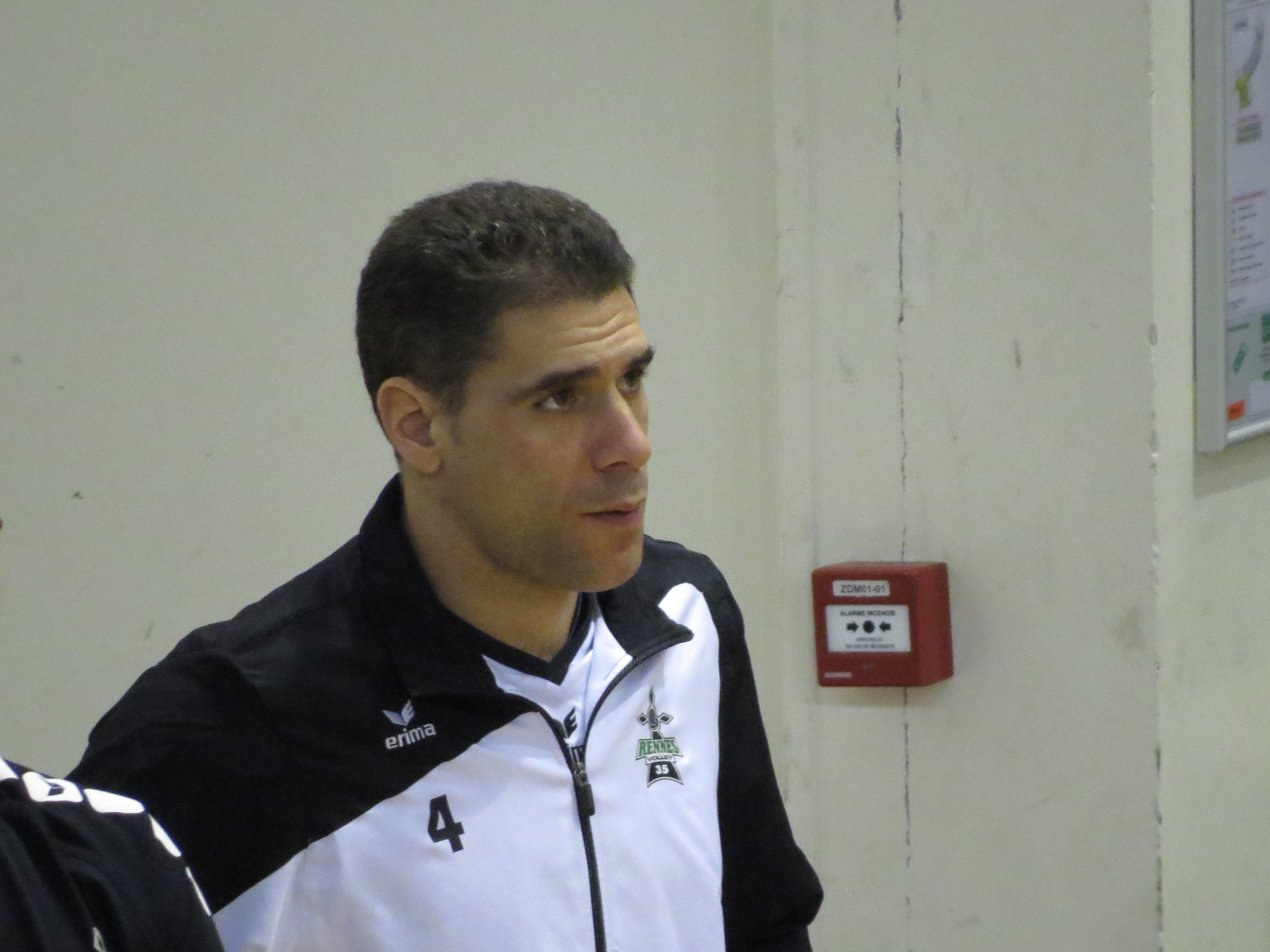
Jordi Gens

Greece

- Andreas Andreadis
- Sotiris Amarianakis
- Theoklitos Karipidis
- Thanassis Moustakidis
- Konstantinos Stivachtis
- Michalis Alexandropoulos
- Athanasios Maroulis
- Akis Chatziantoniou
- Nikos Samaras †
- Sotirios Tsergas
- Ioannis Fakas
- Christos Voloudakis
- Makis Kanellos
- Georgios Kotsilianos
- Giannis Chaslamaidis
- Ilias Lappas
- Konrad Guzda
- Georgios Tzioumakas

Rest of Europe

- Inoslav Krnić
- Jaromír Koláčný
- Christian Strehlau
- Fabrice Bry
- Balša Radunović
- Bela Bunford
- Edin Škorić
- Đula Mešter
- Dejan Brđović
- Jordi Gens
- Julián Torres
- Yuriy Filippov
- Oleg Mushenko

Americas

- Pablo Meana
- Oscar Vizzari
- Santiago Darraidou
- Celso
- Jorge Payan
- Jayson Jablonsky
- Carlos Tejeda
- Fredy Cedeño

Players whose names are italicized still play for the team

== Sponsorships ==
- Great Sponsor: N/A
- Official Sport Clothing Manufacturer: Macron
- Official Broadcaster: N/A

== See also ==
- AEK Women's Volleyball Club
