= Frank Depestele =

Belgian volleyball player

Personal information
- Born: 3 September 1977 (age 49); Tienen, Belgium
- Height: 1.95 m (6 ft 5 in)
- Weight: 150 kg (331 lb)
- Spike: 332 cm (131 in)
- Block: 324 cm (128 in)

Volleyball information
- Position: Setter

Career
Years	Teams
1994–1995; 1996–1997; 1997–1999; 1999–2000; 2000–2002; 2002–2006; 2006–2007; 2007–2008; 2008–2009; 2009–2011; 2011–2012; 2012; 2012–2013; 2013–2015; 2015–2018; 2018	(Belgium) VC Euphony Asse-Lennik (Belgium) Flamingo Maldegem (Belgium) VC Euphony Asse-Lennik (Switzerland) Volley Näfels (Belgium) Topvolley Antwerpen (Belgium) Knack Roeselare (Greece) Iraklis Thessaloniki (Russia) Lokomotiv Belgorod (Greece) Panathinaikos (Belgium) Knack Roeselare (Russia) Iskra Odintsovo (Ukraine) Lokomotyv Kharkiv (Turkey) Fenerbahçe Grundig (France) Beauvais Oise UC (Belgium) VC Euphony Asse-Lennik (Argentina) Club Ciudad de Bolívar

National team
2000–2014	Belgium

Frank Depestele (born 3 September 1977) is a retired Belgian volleyball player and current coach. He is 1.91 m tall and played as a setter. He was a regular player on the national team of which he was also captain. He has won several different individual prizes, including that for Best Setter in the CEV Champions League and Greek Volley League MVP.

== Teams ==
Season	Team	Country
2002–2003	Knack Randstad Roeselare	Belgium
2003–2004	Knack Randstad Roeselare	Belgium
2004–2005	Knack Randstad Roeselare	Belgium
2005–2006	Knack Randstad Roeselare	Belgium
2006–2007	Iraklis Thessaloniki	Greece
2007–2008	Lokomotiv Belgorod	Russia
2008–2009	Panathinaikos VC	Greece
2009–2011	Knack Randstad Roeselare	Belgium
2011–2012	Iskra Odintsovo	Russia
2012	VC Lokomotyv Kharkiv	Ukraine
2012–2013	Fenerbahçe Grundig	Turkey
2013–2015
2018	Personal Bolivar Voley	Argentina

== Honors ==
- Belgium
  - Belgian volley league: 2005, 2006, 2010
  - Belgian volley cup: 2005, 2006, 2011
  - Belgian volley supercup: 2004, 2005
- Greece
  - Greek Volleyball League:2007
  - Greek Super Cup: 2007
