= Guillaume Samica =

French volleyball player

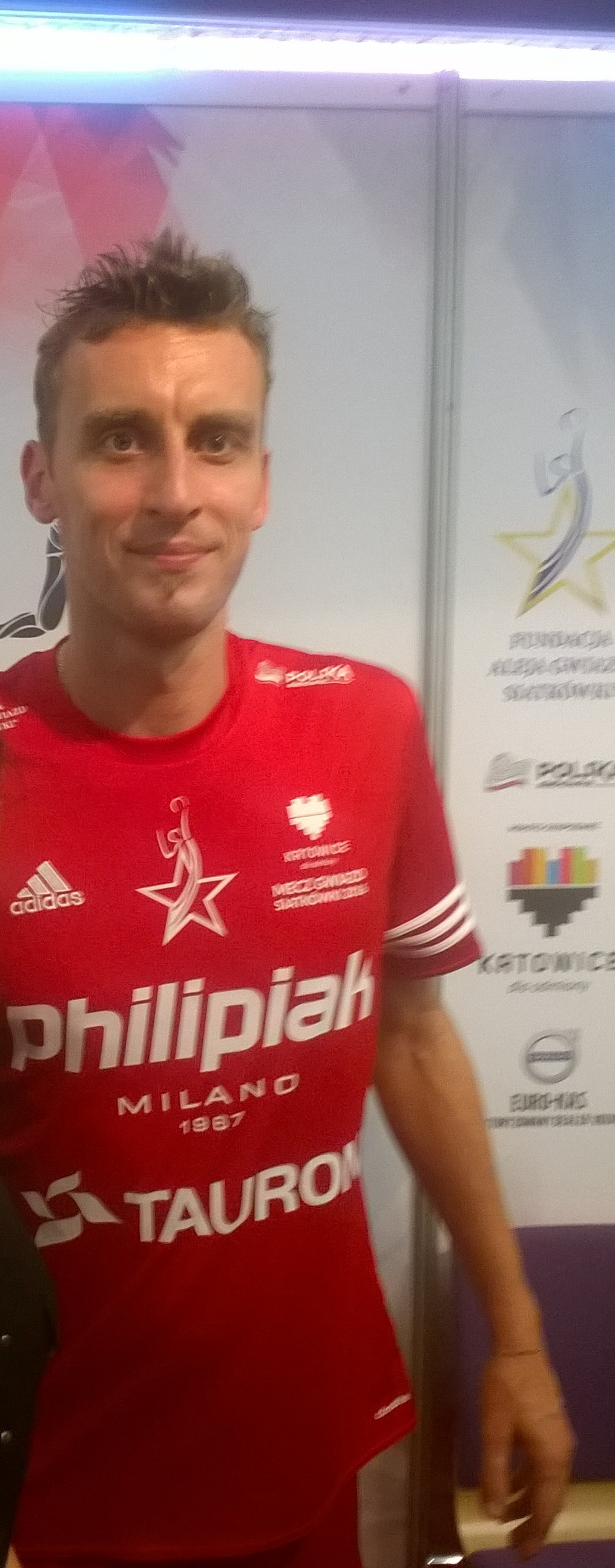

Personal information
- Nationality: French
- Born: 28 September 1981 (age 45); Choisy-au-Bac, France
- Height: 1.98 m (6 ft 6 in)

Volleyball information
- Position: Outside hitter

Career
Years	Teams
2001–2002; 2002–2003; 2003–2004; 2004–2005; 2005–2007; 2007–2008; 2008–2009; 2009–2010; 2010–2011; 2011–2012; 2012–2013; 2013–2014; 2014–2015; 2015–2018	Saint-Quentin Volley; BluVolley Verona; AdriaVolley Trieste; Piemonte Volley; Stade Poitevin Poitiers; Sparkling Volley Milano; Jastrzębski Węgiel; Panathinaikos; Iskra Odintsovo; ZAKSA Kędzierzyn-Koźle; Buenos Aires Unidos; AS Cannes; AZS Częstochowa; AZS Politechnika Warszawska

National team
2003–2012	France (205)
Honours
Men's volleyball
Representing France
FIVB World League
Silver medal – second place	2006 Moscow
CEV European Championship
Silver medal – second place	2009 Turkey

Guillaume Samica (born 28 September 1981) is a French former professional volleyball player, a member of the France national team from 2003 to 2012. A participant at the Olympic Games Athens 2004, and a silver medallist at the 2009 European Championship and the 2006 World League.

== Personal life ==
Samica was born in Choisy-au-Bac. He has Polish and Italian origins.

== Career ==
In December 2014 he moved to Polish club AZS Częstochowa and signed a contract with this team to the end of the 2014/2015 season. Then he went to another Polish club, AZS Politechnika Warszawska and he was playing there until 2018.

== Honours ==
=== Clubs ===
- CEV Challenge Cup
  - 2008/2009 – with Jastrzębski Węgiel
- National championships
  - 2006/2007 French Championship, with Stade Poitevin Poitiers
  - 2009/2010 Greek Cup, with Panathinaikos
  - 2009/2010 Greek Championship, with Panathinaikos
  - 2012/2013 Argentine Championship, with Buenos Aires Unidos
