= Stelios Prosalikas =

Greek volleyball player and coach (born 1953)

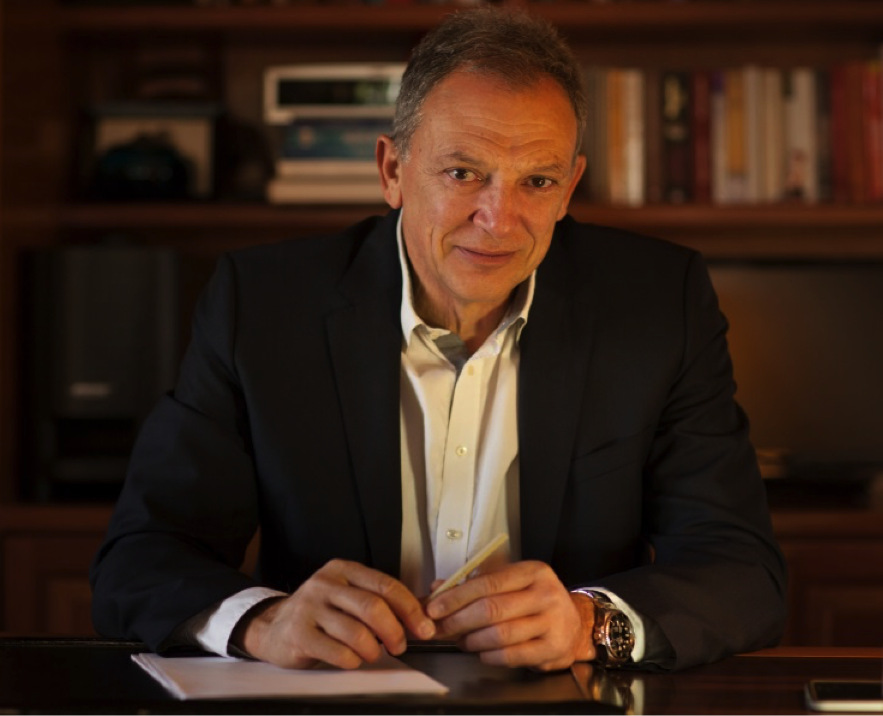
- Portrait of Stelios Prosalikas

Personal information
- Nationality: Greek
- Born: 2 February 1953 (age 73); Athens

Career
Years	Teams
1968–1972; 1972–1982; 1982–1986	(Greece) A.O. Paradeisou (Greece) Olympiacos (Greece) A.O. Paradeisou

National team
Greece

Stelios Prosalikas (Greek: Στέλιος Προσαλίκας, born 2 February 1953) is a retired Greek male volleyball player and volleyball coach. As a player, he had 44 appearances with Greece men's national volleyball team. He played for Olympiacos for 10 years (1972–1982), winning 6 Greek Championships, 1 Greek Cup and the 4th place in the 1981–1982 CEV Champions League Final Four.

Prosalikas coached for Olympiacos, AEK, Panathinaikos, and Greece's national team.

He coached Greece to the 5th place in the 2004 Olympic Games in Athens. From 2008 to 2010 he was president of the Hellenic Volleyball Federation.
