= Sergey Orlenko =

Russian volleyball player (born 1971)

Personal information
- Nationality: Russian
- Born: 10 February 1971 (age 54); Novokuybyshevsk, Russia

Sport
- Sport: Volleyball

Sergey Orlenko (born 10 February 1971) is a Russian volleyball player. He competed in the men's tournament at the 1996 Summer Olympics.
