= Peter Michalovič =

Slovak volleyball player (born 1990)

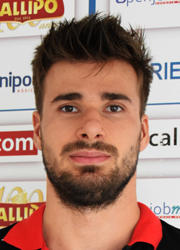
- Michalovič in 2016

Personal information
- Nationality: Slovak
- Born: 26 May 1990 (age 36); Malacky, Czechoslovakia
- Height: 200 cm (6 ft 7 in)
- Weight: 90 kg (198 lb)
- Spike: 349 cm (137 in)
- Block: 335 cm (132 in)

Volleyball information
- Number: 16 (national team)

Career
Years	Teams
2015	Pallavolo Ortona

National team
2015	Slovakia

Peter Michalovič (born 26 May 1990) is a Slovak male volleyball player. He is part of the Slovakia men's national volleyball team. On club level he plays for Pallavolo Ortona.
