= Ethnikos Piraeus V.C. =

Greek volleyball club

- Full name: Ethnikos Piraeus V.C.
- Founded: 1923
- Ground: Panagiotis Salpeas, Piraeus, Greece
- Chairman: A.Printezis
- Manager: G.Klaroudas
- League: A1 Ethniki

Uniforms
Home	Away

Ethnikos Piraeus Volleyball Club is the volleyball department of the Greek multisport club of Ethnikos Piraeus, based in Piraeus. It is one of the oldest sport sections of the club with presence since 1920s. The colours of the club are blue and white and its home arena is the municipal gymnasium of Piraeus "Panagiotis Salpeas'

== History ==
Ethnikos Piraeus took part in an unofficial championship of 1927 regulated by SEGAS. Since 1940s, Ethnikos takes part in the championships continuously. The 1974-75 season, it played for first time in A' Ethniki (1st-tier championship). So far has played in A' Ethniki five times (1975, 1976, 1980, 1981, 1990). The last season, Ethnikos played in A2 Ethniki and finished in 4th place.

=== Recent seasons ===
Season	Division	Place	Notes
2012-13	A2 Ethniki	12th	Relegated to ESPEDA
2013-14	ESPEDA	1st	Promoted to A2 Ethniki
2014-15	A2 Ethniki	4th	
2015-16	A2 Ethniki	4th	
2016-17	Α2 Ethniki	1st	Promoted to A1 Ethniki
