= Panathinaikos V.C. =

Greek volleyball club

Panathinaikos
- Nickname: The Trifolium; The Greens
- Founded: 1919; 107 years ago
- Ground: Mets Indoor Hall (Capacity: 1,200)
- Chairman: Dimitris Vranopoulos
- Manager: Dimitris Andreopoulos
- Captain: Athanasios Protopsaltis
- League: Greek Volleyleague
- 2025–26: 1st (Champions)
- Website: Club home page
- Championships: 22

Uniforms
Home	Away

Panathinaikos V.C. (Greek: ΤΑΑ Παναθηναϊκός Α.Ο.), also known simply as Panathinaikos, or with its full name Panathinaikos A.O. (Greek: Παναθηναϊκός Αθλητικός Όμιλος, transliterated "Panathinaikos Athlitikos Omilos", Panathenaic Athletic Club) is the professional volleyball team of the major Athens based multi-sport club Panathinaikos A.O. Founded in 1919, it is one of the oldest and most successful volleyball clubs in Greece. They have won 22 Greek Championships finishing 6 times undefeated (1962–63, 1965–66, 1966–67, 1969–70, 1970–71, 1974–75), 7 Greek Cups, 3 Greek League Cups and 3 Greek Super Cups. They have reached also twice the CEV Cup final (1979–80, 2008–09).

Notable Greek player have played for the team, while foreign world-class players that have played with the club include Dante Amaral, Marcelo Elgarten, André Nascimento, Frank Depestele, Liberman Agamez, Peter Pláteník, Jakub Novotný, Plamen Konstantinov, Boyan Yordanov, Björn Andrae, Andrija Gerić, Clayton Stanley, Ernardo Gómez, Renaud Herpe, Guillaume Samica, Dawid Murek, Paweł Zagumny and Łukasz Żygadło.

== History ==
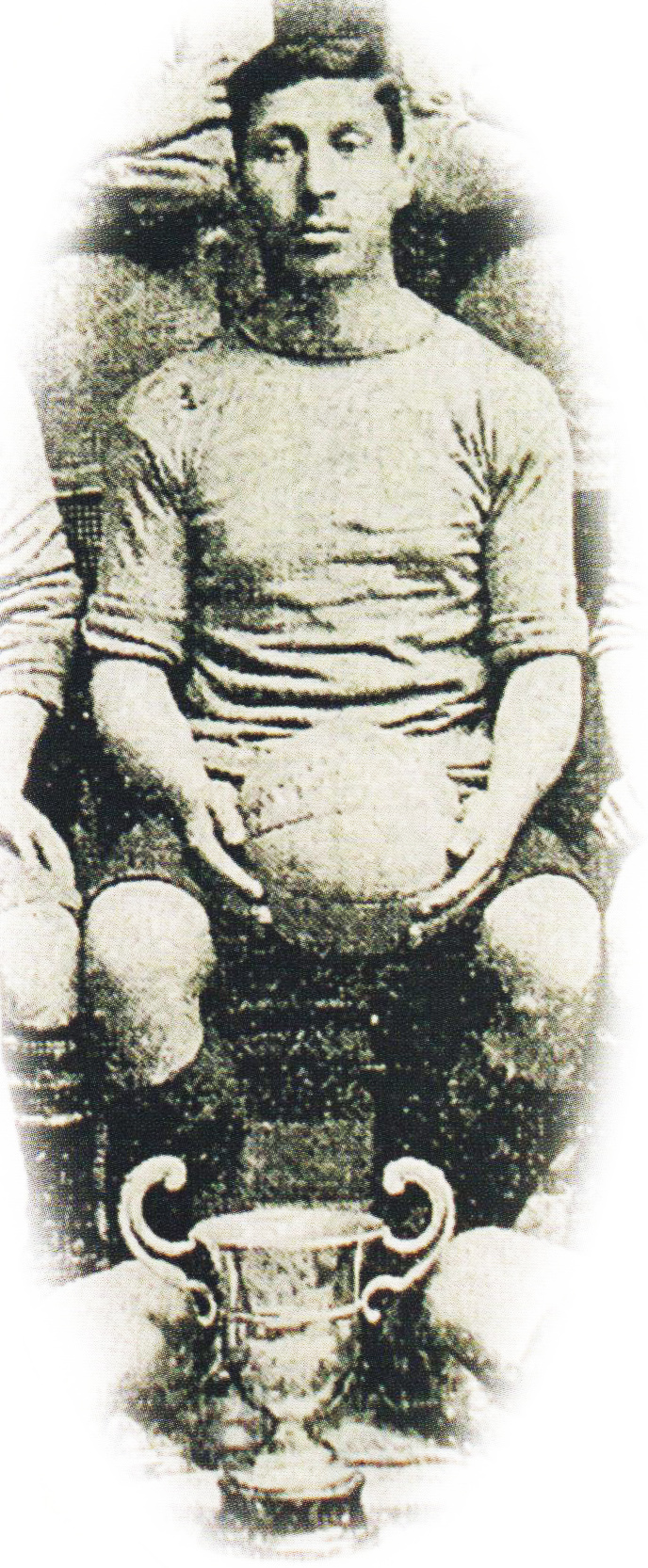
Georgios Kalafatis

The volleyball department of Panathinaikos was founded in 1919 and is one of the first in Greece. With the participation of Giorgos Kalafatis in the Inter-Allied Games of Paris in 1919, and the informations he collected, the sport became more known in Greece. The same year the officials of the club decided the creation of a volleyball team.

The first dynamic presence of the team is dated back in the years 1927–29 with many popular players of the time such as the founder Giorgos Kalafatis, the historical member of the board Apostolos Nikolaidis, as well as players such as Athanasios Aravositas, Goumas, Arg. Nikolaidis, Papageorgiou and Papastefanou. In the following years the interest for volleyball became less until before World War II when Panathinaikos presented a powerful team with leader players such as Lambrou, Vallidis, Momferatos, Tzoumanis, Proselentis, Lykouris, Kakridis and more.

During the 60’s and 70’s, Panathinaikos' volleyball club won many titles and honors due to the fact that the team roster has always included some of the leading volleyball players and coaches in Greece. The first and most popular generation of players of 60’s was Andreas and Nikos Bergeles, as well as Iliopoulos, Leloudas, Chasapis, Emmanouil, Perros and Fotiou who opened the road for the next generations. Notable coaches of this era was the leading figure of the department Gerasimos Theodoratos, the Yugoslavian Sava Grozdanović and later the ex-player of the team Andreas Bergeles.

The most important achievement of the team was the participation in the final of the European Cup in 1980 with Grozdanović as coach and players such as Georgantis, Agrapidakis, Iliopoulos, Papadopoulos, Malousaris, Gountakos, Astras, Kokkinaras and Koliopoulos. In the following years, Panathinaikos team continued to dominate the Greek championship with Janusz Badora as coach and players such as Kazazis, Tentzeris, Gontikas, Galakos, Dimitriadis, Margaronis, Karamaroudis and Andreopoulos.

Two of the most successful periods have been 1994-95 and 1995-96 seasons, when Panathinaikos won 2 consecutive championships with Stelios Prosalikas as head coach and Andreopoulos, Triantafillidis, Filippov, Spanos, Hatziantoniou, Ouzounov, A. Kovacev, S. Kovacev, Karamaroudis, Mavrakis, Konstantinidis, Zakynthinos, Koutouleas, Tonev as players.

In 2001 the department became professional under the presidency and financial support of Vlassis Stathokostopoulos and later Thanasis Giannakopoulos.

In 2004 the team won the Championship with the ex-player Stelios Kazazis as coach. With the Brazilian star-player Dante Amaral and Marcelo Elgarten, they made a strong team and finished again first in 2006, while they reached again the final of the European Cup in 2009.

== Honours ==
=== Domestic ===
- Greek Championship: (22)
  - 1963, 1965, 1966, 1967, 1970, 1971, 1972, 1973, 1975, 1977, 1982, 1984, 1985, 1986, 1995, 1996, 2004, 2006, 2020, 2022, 2025, 2026
- Greek Cup: (7)
  - 1982, 1984, 1985, 2007, 2008, 2010, 2026
- Greek League Cup: (4)
  - 2020, 2022, 2023, 2024
- Greek Super Cup: (3)
  - 2006, 2022, 2026

== Current men's volleyball squad ==
Team roster – season 2026/2027

No.	Name	Date of birth	Position
1	(Greece) Stavros Kasampalis	June 1, 1995 (age 31)	setter
2	(Greece) Giorgos Papalexiou	August 28, 1999 (age 27)	middle blocker
6	(United States) Patrick Gasman	January 2, 1997 (age 29)	middle blocker
7	(Ukraine) Dmytro Yanchuk	May 19, 1999 (age 27)	outside hitter
8	(Denmark) Rasmus Breuning Nielsen	May 22, 1994 (age 32)	opposite
9	(France) Timothée Carle	November 30, 1995 (age 30)	outside hitter
11	(Greece) Anastasios Grillas	March 31, 2007 (age 19)	libero
12	(Greece) Theodoros Voulkidis	March 30, 1996 (age 30)	middle blocker
13	(Greece) Charalampos Andreopoulos	January 23, 2001 (age 25)	outside hitter
16	(Bulgaria) Nikolay Kolev	December 16, 1997 (age 28)	middle blocker
19	(Greece) Angelos Mandilaris	November 7, 1998 (age 27)	opposite
31	(Italy) Luca Spirito	October 30, 1993 (age 32)	setter
70	(Greece) Aristeidis Chandrinos	November 20, 2002 (age 23)	libero
77	(Greece) Athanasios Protopsaltis (c)	September 12, 1993 (age 33)	outside hitter
Head coach: (Greece) Dimitris Andreopoulos

=== Technical and managerial staff ===
Staff
Head coach	(Greece) Dimitris Andreopoulos
Assistant coach	(Greece) Pavlos Karamaroudis
Assistant coach / Trainer	(Greece) Christos Mpelos
Assistant coach	(Greece) Antonis Theodoropoulos
Statistician	(Greece) Alkiviadis Mpelos
Physiotherapist	(Greece) Napoleon Charisis
Physiotherapist	(Greece) Panagiotis Vlachas
Team manager	(Greece) Roulis Agrapidakis
Team manager	(Greece) Sotiris Choumos

=== Retired numbers ===
Panathinaikos men's volleyball retired numbers
N°	Nat.	Player	Position	Tenure
14	(Greece)	Sotiris Pantaleon	Middle Blocker	1996–2012, 2014–2021

== Selected former players ==
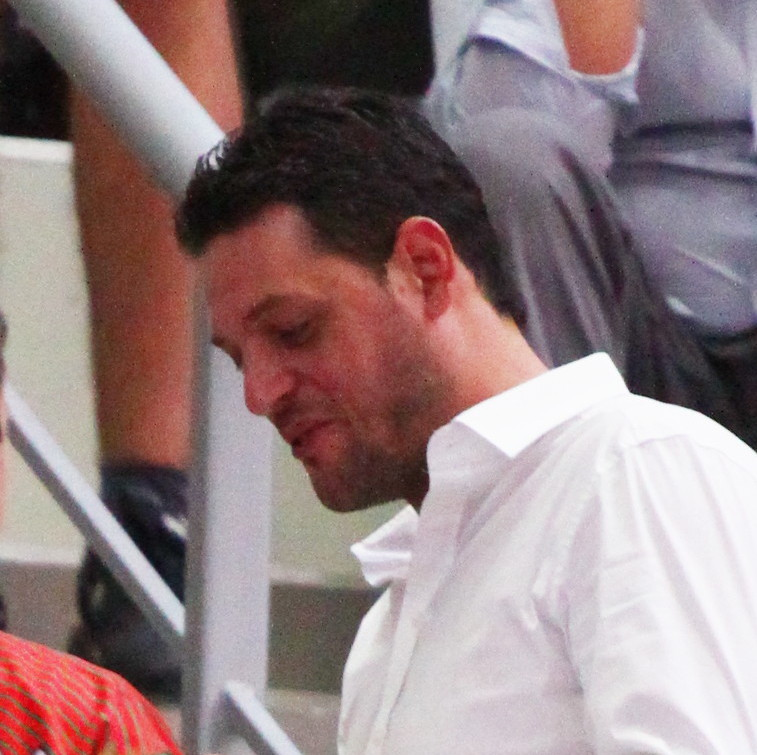
Plamen Konstantinov

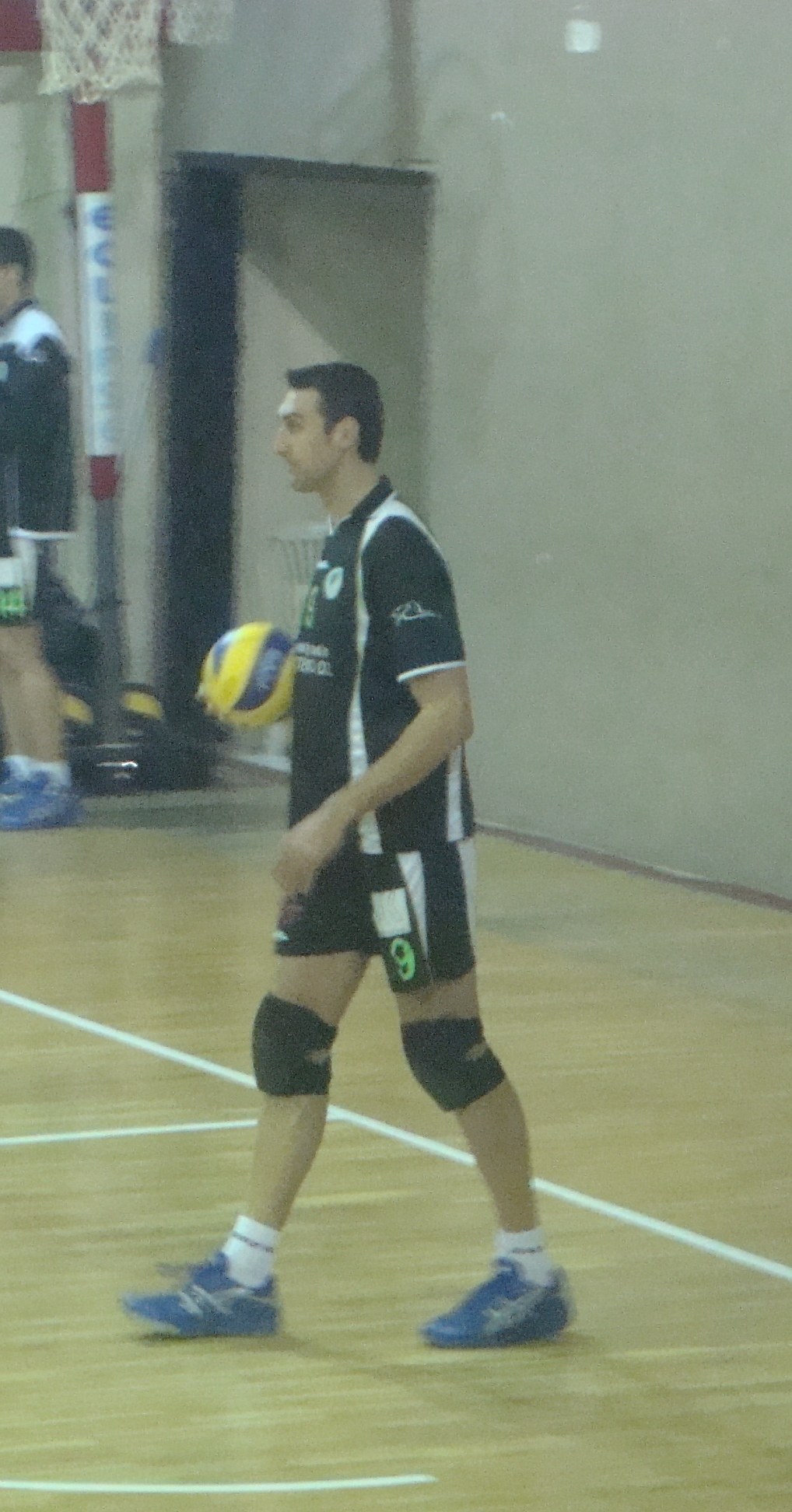
Nikos Samaras

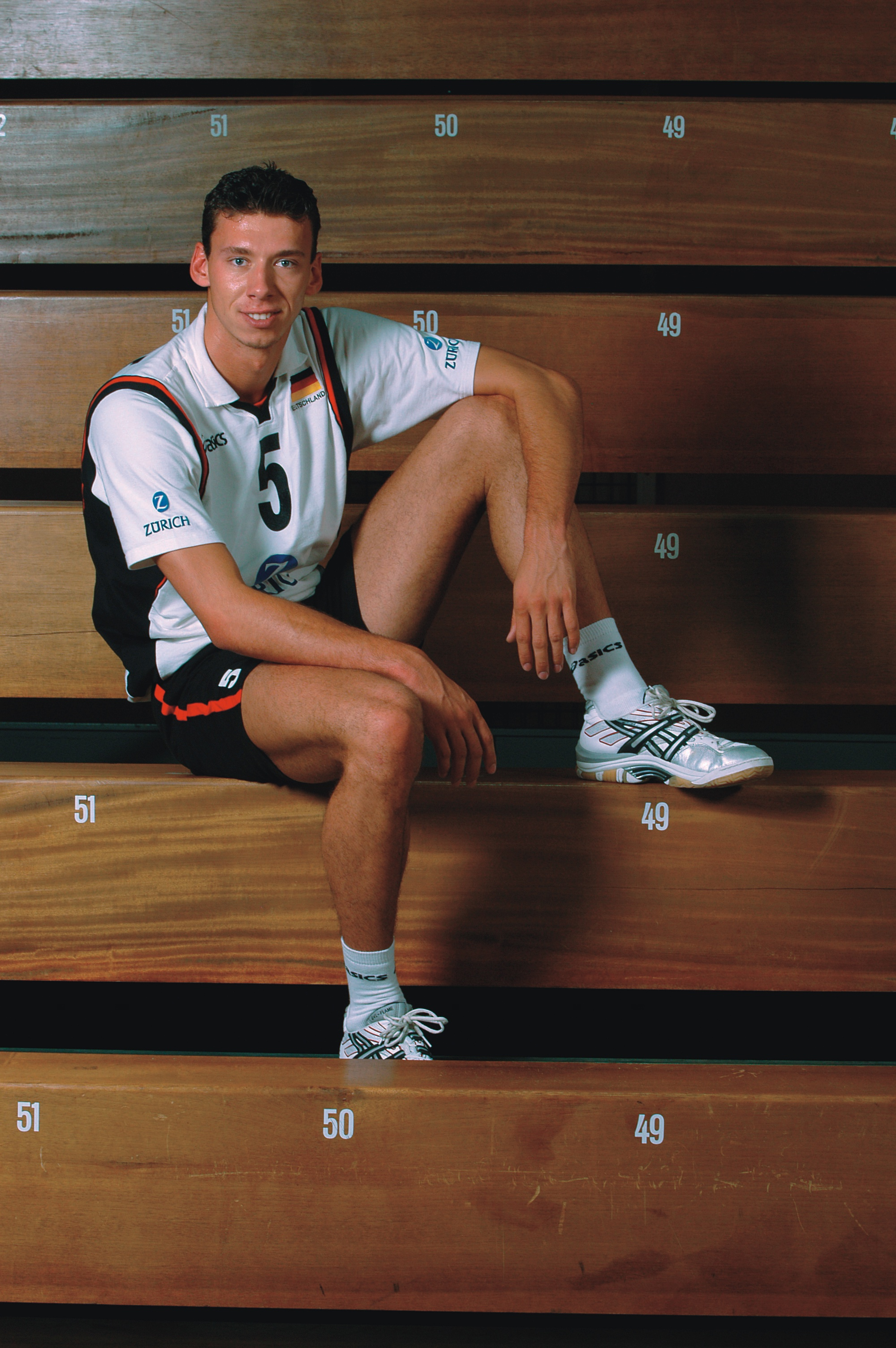
Bjoern Andrae

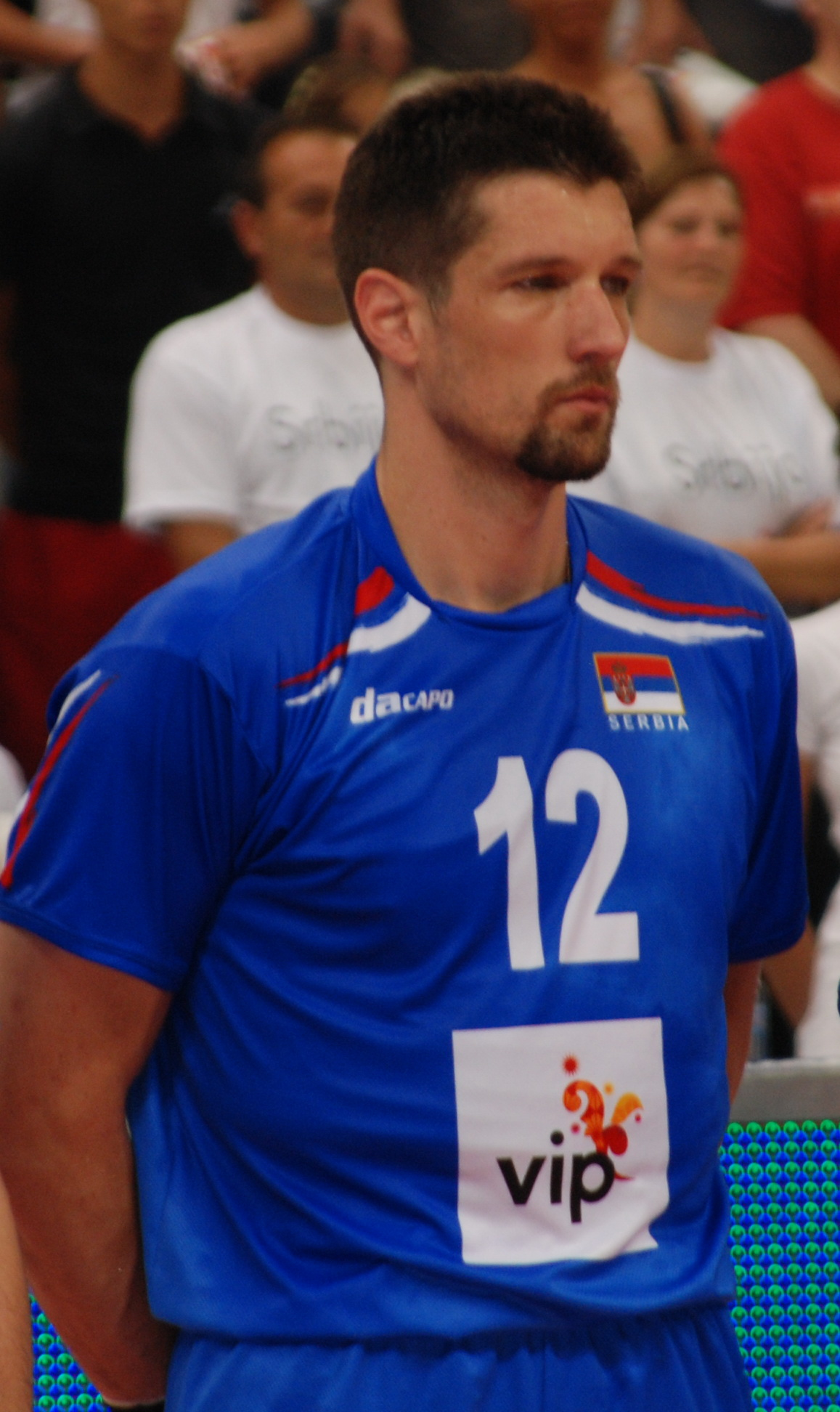
Andrija Gerić

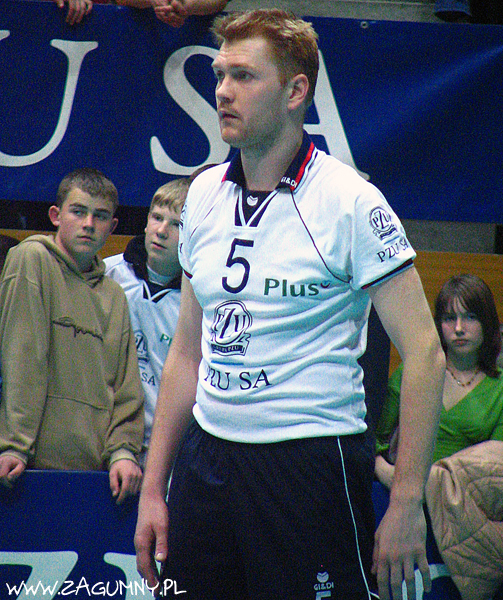
Paweł Zagumny

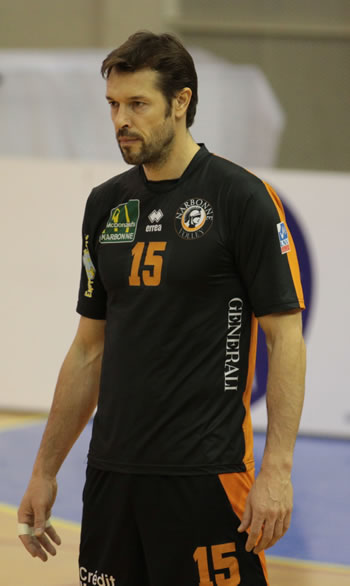
Renaud Herpe

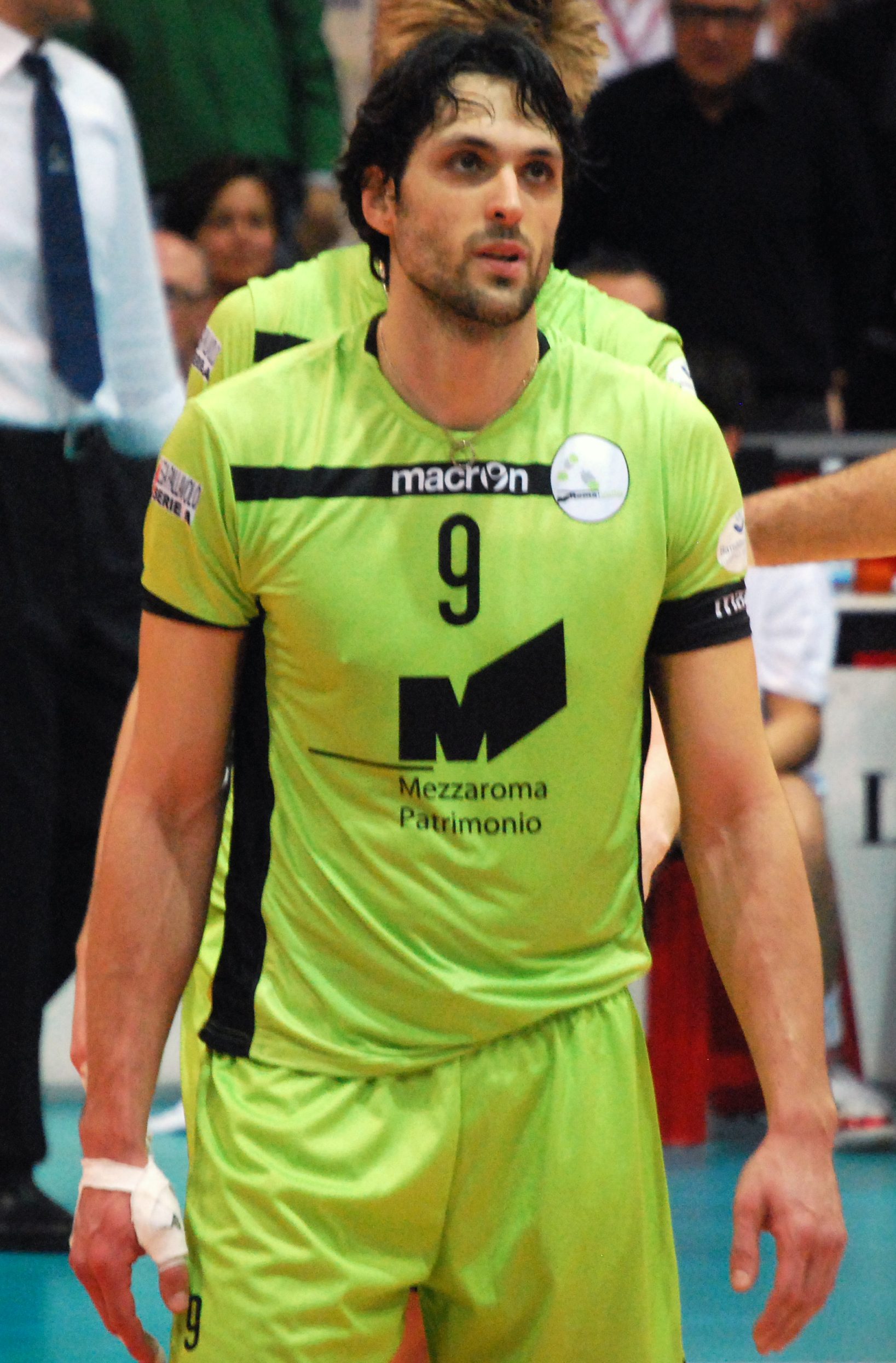
Gianluca Saraceni

Albania

- (Albania) (Greece) Albano Qualiu
- (Albania) (Greece) Alvi Shurdhi

Argentina

- (Argentina) José Luis González

Belgium

- (Belgium) Frank Depestele
- (Belgium) Bram Van Den Dries

Bosnia-Herzegovina

- (Bosnia and Herzegovina) Milorad Kovać

Brazil

- (Brazil) Dante Amaral
- (Brazil) Eduardo Arruda
- (Brazil) Hugo de Leon Bozo
- (Brazil) Marcelo Elgarten
- (Brazil) Windson Ferreira
- (Brazil) (Italy) Roberto Minuzzi
- (Brazil) Carlos Alexandre Moreira
- (Brazil) Andre Nascimento
- (Brazil) Marcelo Mendes Sacchi
- (Brazil) Cleber De Oliveira
- (Brazil) Lucas Victor Rangel
- (Brazil) (Italy) Vinicius Raguzzoni

Bulgaria

- (Bulgaria) (Greece) Theodoros Baev
- (Bulgaria) Plamen Konstantinov
- (Bulgaria) Petar Ouzounov
- (Bulgaria) Dimo Tonev
- (Bulgaria) Aleksandar Simeonov
- (Bulgaria) (Greece) Boyan Yordanov
- (Bulgaria) Ivan Kovlev
- (Bulgaria) (Greece) Antonis Kovachev

Canada

- (Canada) Keith Sanheim
- (Canada) Michael Amoroso
- (Canada) Derrick Epp
- (Canada) Cameron Kern
- (Canada) Maxwell Elgert

Colombia

- (Colombia) (Greece) Liberman Agamez

Croatia

- (Croatia) Danijel Galić

Cuba

- (Cuba) Osniel Melgarejo
- (Cuba) Fernando Hernández
- (Cuba) Raydel Hierrezuelo

Cyprus

- (Cyprus) (Greece) Thanasis Protopsaltis

Czech Republic

- (Czech Republic) Jakub Novotný
- (Czech Republic) Petr Pešl
- (Czech Republic) Peter Pláteník
- (Czech Republic) Dalibor Polak
- (Czech Republic) Petr Zapletal

Denmark

- (Denmark) (Argentina) Axel Jacobsen
- (Denmark) Rasmus Breuning Nielsen

Egypt

- (Egypt) (Greece) Ionas Rezk

France

- (France) Fabrice Bry
- (France) Ludovic Castard
- (France) Renaud Herpe
- (France) Guillaume Samica

Germany

- (Germany) Björn Andrae

Greece

- (Greece) Roulis Agrapidakis
- (Greece) Asimakis Alexiou
- (Greece) Andreas Andreadis
- (Greece) Charalampos Andreopoulos
- (Greece) Dimitris Andreopoulos
- (Greece) Andreas Bergeles
- (Greece) Nikos Bergeles
- (Greece) Theodoros Chatziantoniou
- (Greece) Kostas Christofidelis
- (Greece) Dimitris Gontikas
- (Greece) Christos Dimitrakopoulos
- (Greece) Stathis Donas
- (Greece) Pavlos Karamaroudis
- (Greece) Nikos Karatzas
- (Greece) Stelios Kazazis
- (Greece) Michalis Koliopoulos
- (Greece) (Bulgaria) Antonis Kovatsev
- (Greece) (Bulgaria) Savvas Kovatsev
- (Greece) Giannis Laios
- (Greece) Giannis Lambrou
- (Greece) Ilias Lappas
- (Greece) Christos Papadopoulos
- (Greece) Sotirios Pantaleon
- (Greece) Panagiotis Pelekoudas
- (Greece) Giorgos Petreas
- (Greece) Spiros Protopsaltis
- (Greece) Thanasis Psarras
- (Greece) Alexandros Raptis
- (Greece) (Germany) Nikos Samaras
- (Greece) Giorgos Spanos
- (Greece) Georgios Stefanou
- (Greece) Nikolaos Smaragdis
- (Greece) Akis Sidiropoulos
- (Greece) Gerasimos Theodoratos
- (Greece) Michalis Triantafyllidis
- (Greece) Giorgos Zakynthinos
- (Greece) Dimitris Zisis

Italy

- (Italy) Gianluca Saraceni
- (Italy) (Czech Republic) Jiří Kovář
- (Italy) Luca Spirito

Montenegro

- (Montenegro) Vojin Ćaćić

Netherlands

- (Netherlands) Jairo Hooi
- (Netherlands) Maarten van Garderen

North Macedonia

- (North Macedonia) Filip Savovski

Norway

- (Norway) Jonas Kvalen

Poland

- (Poland) Tomasz Józefacki
- (Poland) Michał Kamiński
- (Poland) Dawid Murek
- (Poland) Paweł Zagumny
- (Poland) Łukasz Żygadło

Russia

- (Russia) Sergey Orlenko
- (Russia) (Ukraine) Gennady Cheremisov

Serbia

- (Serbia) Andrija Gerić
- (Serbia) Saša Starović
- (Serbia) Miloš Stojković
- (Serbia) Željko Tanasković

Slovenia

- (Slovenia) Sašo Štalekar

Spain

- (Spain) Jordi Gens

Ukraine

- (Ukraine) (Russia) Yuri Filippov
- (Ukraine) Dmytro Yanchuk

United States

- (United States) Brian Cook
- (United States) Jared Moore
- (United States) Jeff Nygaard
- (United States) Brenden Sander
- (United States) Clayton Stanley
- (United States) (Germany) Nick Vogel
- (United States) Patrick Gasman

Venezuela

- (Venezuela) Hernando Gomez

== Selected former coaches ==
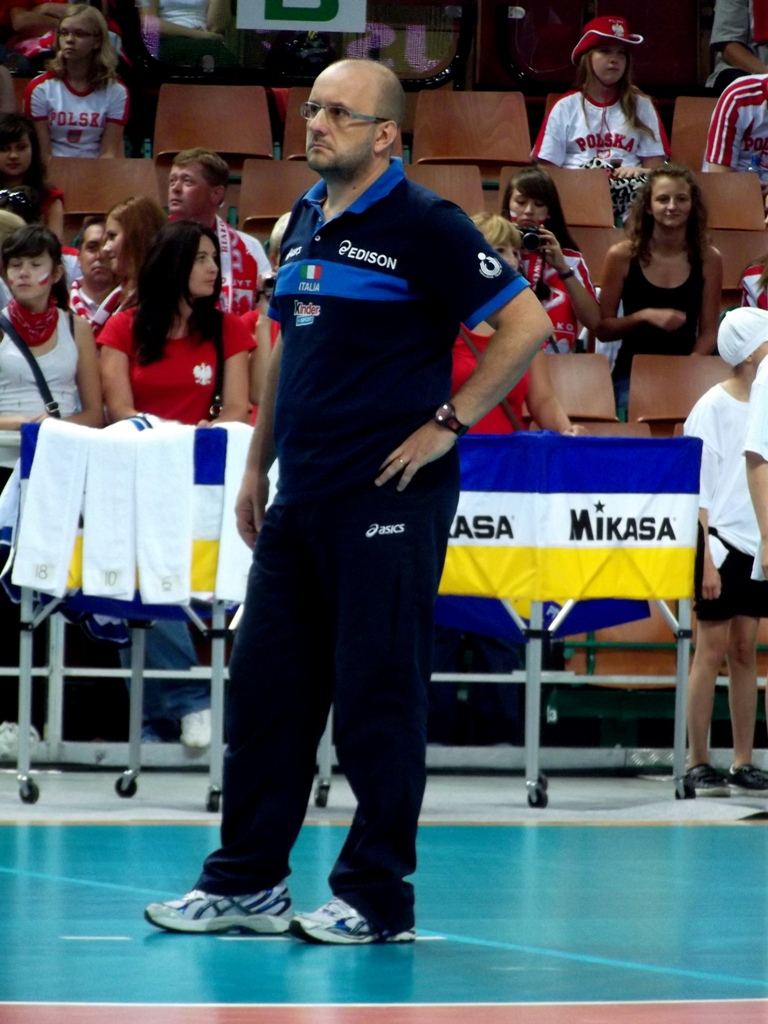
Mauro Berruto

- (Greece) Gerasimos Theodoratos
- (Serbia) Sava Grozdanović
- (Greece) Andreas Bergeles
- (Greece) Nikos Bergeles
- (Romania) Aurel Constantinescu
- (Poland) Janusz Badora
- (Greece) Stelios Prosalikas
- (Argentina) Carlos Xavier Weber
- (Brazil) Francisco dos Santos
- (Italy) Mauro Berruto
- (Greece) Alekos Leonis
- (Greece) Stelios Kazazis

== International record ==
Season	Achievement	Notes
CEV Champions League
1982–83	Quarter–final
1995–96	7th place
1996–97	5th place
2007–08	Play–off 6
Cup Winners Cup
1976–77	Quarter–final
1979–80	Final	defeated by Panini Modena, 2–3 sets in Athens
1981–82	Quarter–final
1983–84	Quarter–final
1987–88	Quarter–final
1988–89	Final four	3rd place
1989–90	Quarter–final
1990–91	Quarter–final
1991–92	Quarter–final
Top Teams Cup
2005–06	Final four	3rd place
CEV Cup
2001–02	Quarter–final	eliminated by Asystel Milano
2002–03	Quarter–final	eliminated by Tourcoing Lille Metropole
2003–04	Final four	4th place
2008–09	Final	2nd place
CEV Challenge Cup
2021–22	Semi–final	eliminated by Halkbank Ankara
2022–23	Semi–final	eliminated by Olympiacos

== Season by season ==
Season	Tier	League	Pos.
1960–61	1	Panhellenic Championship	2nd place, silver medalist(s)
1961–62	1	Panhellenic Championship	3rd place, bronze medalist(s)
1962–63	1	Panhellenic Championship	1st place, gold medalist(s)
1963–64	1	Panhellenic Championship	—
1964–65	1	Panhellenic Championship	1st place, gold medalist(s)
1965–66	1	Panhellenic Championship	1st place, gold medalist(s)
1966–67	1	Panhellenic Championship	1st place, gold medalist(s)
1967–68	1	Panhellenic Championship	2nd place, silver medalist(s)
1968–69	1	A Ethniki	2nd place, silver medalist(s)
1969–70	1	A Ethniki	1st place, gold medalist(s)
1970–71	1	A Ethniki	1st place, gold medalist(s)
1971–72	1	A Ethniki	1st place, gold medalist(s)
1972–73	1	A Ethniki	1st place, gold medalist(s)
1973–74	1	A Ethniki	2nd place, silver medalist(s)
1974–75	1	A Ethniki	1st place, gold medalist(s)
1975–76	1	A Ethniki	2nd place, silver medalist(s)
1976–77	1	A Ethniki	1st place, gold medalist(s)
1977–78	1	A Ethniki	2nd place, silver medalist(s)
1978–79	1	A Ethniki	2nd place, silver medalist(s)
1979–80	1	A Ethniki	2nd place, silver medalist(s)
1980–81	1	A Ethniki	2nd place, silver medalist(s)
1981–82	1	A Ethniki	1st place, gold medalist(s)
1982–83	1	A Ethniki	2nd place, silver medalist(s)
1983–84	1	A Ethniki	1st place, gold medalist(s)
1984–85	1	A Ethniki	1st place, gold medalist(s)

Season	Tier	League	Pos.
1985–86	1	A Ethniki	1st place, gold medalist(s)
1986–87	1	A Ethniki	2nd place, silver medalist(s)
1987–88	1	A Ethniki	2nd place, silver medalist(s)
1988–89	1	A1 Ethniki	2nd place, silver medalist(s)
1989–90	1	A1 Ethniki	2nd place, silver medalist(s)
1990–91	1	A1 Ethniki	2nd place, silver medalist(s)
1991–92	1	A1 Ethniki	2nd place, silver medalist(s)
1992–93	1	A1 Ethniki	5
1993–94	1	A1 Ethniki	5
1994–95	1	A1 Ethniki	1st place, gold medalist(s)
1995–96	1	A1 Ethniki	1st place, gold medalist(s)
1996–97	1	A1 Ethniki	4
1997–98	1	A1 Ethniki	4
1998–99	1	A1 Ethniki	7
1999–00	1	A1 Ethniki	7
2000–01	1	A1 Ethniki	3rd place, bronze medalist(s)
2001–02	1	A1 Ethniki	3rd place, bronze medalist(s)
2002–03	1	A1 Ethniki	3rd place, bronze medalist(s)
2003–04	1	A1 Ethniki	1st place, gold medalist(s)
2004–05	1	A1 Ethniki	3rd place, bronze medalist(s)
2005–06	1	A1 Ethniki	1st place, gold medalist(s)
2006–07	1	A1 Ethniki	2nd place, silver medalist(s)
2007–08	1	A1 Ethniki	2nd place, silver medalist(s)
2008–09	1	A1 Ethniki	2nd place, silver medalist(s)
2009–10	1	A1 Ethniki	2nd place, silver medalist(s)

Season	Tier	League	Pos.
2010–11	1	Volley League	3rd place, bronze medalist(s)
2011–12	1	Volley League	10
2012–13	1	Volley League	10
2013–14	1	Volley League	10
2014–15	1	Volley League	4
2015–16	1	Volley League	5
2016–17	1	Volley League	3rd place, bronze medalist(s)
2017–18	1	Volley League	11
2018–19	1	Volley League	5
2019–20	1	Volley League	1st place, gold medalist(s)
2020–21	1	Volley League	3rd place, bronze medalist(s)
2021–22	1	Volley League	1st place, gold medalist(s)
2022–23	1	Volley League	3rd place, bronze medalist(s)
2023–24	1	Volley League	2nd place, silver medalist(s)
2024–25	1	Volley League	1st place, gold medalist(s)
2025–26	1	Volley League	1st place, gold medalist(s)

== Sponsorships ==
Period	Kit manufacturer	Shirt main sponsor
2000–2001	Asics	Warsteiner
2001–2002	Nike	—
2002–2004	Caan	EVGA
2004–2008	Adidas	Subaru
2009–2012	Asics	—
2012–2015	Fila	—
2015–2017	Erreà	Counterpain
2017–2018	Erreà	—
2018–2019	Athlos Sport	Pame Stoixima
2019–2023	Macron	Pame Stoixima
2024–2026	Adidas	Pame Stoixima

== Arenas ==
Arena	Capacity	Years
Leoforos Indoor Hall	1,500	1960s–2004
Glyfada Indoor Hall	2,270	2004–2009; 2010–2011
Mets Indoor Hall	1,200	2009–2010; 2011–2013; 2023–present
Panellinios Indoor Hall	1,100	2013–2019
Maroussi Saint Thomas Indoor Hall	1,700	2019–2023

== Presidents ==
- 2001–08: Vlassis Stathokostopoulos
- 2008–09: Thanasis Giannakopoulos
- 2009–11: Thodoris Liakopoulos
- 2011: Stratos Sopilis
- 2011–13: Chronis Akritidis
- 2013–16: Manolis Ladoukakis
- 2016–18: Dimitris Kassaris
- 2018–20: Alexandros Ellinas
- 2020–25: Panagiotis Malakates
- 2025–: Dimitris Vranopoulos

== See also ==
- Panathinaikos women's volleyball
