= Vasileios Kournetas =

Greek volleyball player (born 1976)

Personal information
- Born: 2 August 1976 (age 50) Athens, Greece
- Height: 1.91 m (6 ft 3 in)
- Weight: 82 kg (181 lb)
- Spike: 336 cm (132 in)
- Block: 320 cm (130 in)

Volleyball information
- Position: setter
- Current club: retired

Career
- Years: Team
- 1988–1996 1996–2009 2009–2010 2010–2011 2011–2013 2013–2014 2014–2016: (Greece) Filia Ilioupolis (Greece) Olympiacos (Russia) Lokomotiv Belgorod (Greece) EA Patras (Greece) Foinikas Syros (Greece) Olympiacos (Greece) PAOK

National team
- Years: Team
- –: Greece, 279 caps

Vasileios "Vasilis" Kournetas (Greek: Βασίλης Κουρνέτας; born 2 August 1976) is a retired Greek volleyball player. A long-standing member of Greece men's national volleyball team, he played in more than 270 games with the Greek team and he competed at the 2004 Summer Olympics in Athens, finishing at the fifth place. He played in Greece for Olympiacos Piraeus, PAOK, E.A. Patras, Foinikas Syros V.C. and Filia Ilioupolis as well as in Russia for Lokomotiv Belgorod. He announced his retirement from volleyball courts on 5 May 2016. As a key member of Olympiacos for 14 years (1996–2009, 2013–2014) he won 1 CEV Cup, 7 Greek Championships, 6 Greek Cups, 1 Greek Super Cup and reached the final of the 2001–02 CEV Champions League with the Reds. He also won the 2012 Greek League Cup with Foinikas Syros as well as 2 Greek Championships and 1 Greek Cup with PAOK in the two final seasons of his professional career (2014-2016).

== Sporting achievements ==
=== Olympic Games ===
- 5th place Athens 2004, with Greece National Team

=== CEV Champions League ===
- 2001/2002, with Olympiacos

=== CEV Cup ===
- 1996/1997, with Olympiacos
- 1997/1998, with Olympiacos
- 2004/2005, with Olympiacos

=== National Championships/Cups ===
- 1996/1997 Greek Cup, with Olympiacos
- 1997/1998 Greek Championship, with Olympiacos
- 1997/1998 Greek Cup, with Olympiacos
- 1998/1999 Greek Championship, with Olympiacos
- 1998/1999 Greek Cup, with Olympiacos
- 1999/2000 Greek Championship, with Olympiacos
- 1999/2000 Greek Super Cup, with Olympiacos
- 2000/2001 Greek Championship, with Olympiacos
- 2000/2001 Greek Cup, with Olympiacos
- 2002/2003 Greek Championship, with Olympiacos
- 2008/2009 Greek Championship, with Olympiacos
- 2008/2009 Greek Cup, with Olympiacos
- 2009/2010 Russian Volleyball Super League, with Lokomotiv Belgorod
- 2011/2012 Greek League Cup, with Foinikas Syros V.C.
- 2013/2014 Greek Championship, with Olympiacos
- 2013/2014 Greek Cup, with Olympiacos
- 2014/2015 Greek Championship, with PAOK
- 2014/2015 Greek Cup, with PAOK
- 2015/2016 Greek Championship, with PAOK

=== Individual ===
- 1999 Greek Cup - Most Valuable Player
- 2015 Greek Cup - Most Valuable Player

== Clubs ==
- (Greece) Filia Ilioupolis (1988-1996)
- (Greece) Olympiacos (1996-2009)
- (Russia) Lokomotiv Belgorod (2009-2010)
- (Greece) E.A. Patras (2010-2011)
- (Greece) Foinikas Syros V.C. (2011-2013)
- (Greece) Olympiacos (2013-2014)
- (Greece) PAOK (2014-2016)

== See also ==
- Greece at the 2004 Summer Olympics
