= A.E. Nikaia =

Greek volleyball club

A.E. Nikaia (full name Athlitiki Enosi Nikaia) was a volleyball club based in Nikaia. The club was founded in 2001, after the merger of the Ionikos Nikaias and G.N.O. Aris Nikaias volleyball clubs. The team's greatest success was winning the Greek Volleyball Cup in 2003. A.E. Nikaia beat Panathinaikos V.C. in the finals, 3–2. Following the championship, the team experienced many financial problems and was eventually relegated to the A2 division, during 2005–2006 season. After one year in the second division, the club dissolved.

== Honours ==
1 Greek Cup: 2003

== 2003 Final ==
Kalamata 1 February 2003

- A.E. Nikaia – Panathinaikos V.C. 3–2 (25–22, 25–27, 25–21, 22–25, 18–16)
- MVP: (Argentina) Jorge Elgueta
- Rosters:
- A.E. Nikaia (Drikos): Psarras 3,Georgios Ntrakovits 22, William Priddy 21, Jorge Elgueta 20, Kalaitsidis 4, Nikolay Jeliazkov 14-

Georgios Stefanou (Libero-63% reception)/Vardis, Bellos 1

- Panathinaikos V.C. (Ricci): Sidiropoulos 2, André Nascimento 21, Cleber de Oliveira 20, Dawid Murek 17, Theodoros Chatziantoniou 9, Pantaleon 10, – Christos Dimitrakopoulos (Libero-67% reception)/ Donas, Livathinos, Kouroupis.

== Notable players ==
- (Argentina) Jorge Elgueta
- (United States) William Priddy
- (Bulgaria) Nikolay Jeliazkov
- (Greece) Georgios Ntrakovits
- (Greece) Georgios Stefanou
- (Greece) Dimitrios Soultanopoulos
