= Kazazis =

Kazazis (Greek: Καζάζης) is a Greek surname. Notable people with the surname include:

- Dimitrios Kazazis (born 1966), Greek volleyball player and coach
- Neoklis Kazazis (1849–1936), Greek lawyer, university professor, and writer
