= Georgios Stefanou =

Greek volleyball player (born 1981)

Personal information
- Nationality: Greek
- Born: 12 January 1981 (age 45)
- Height: 1.87 m (6 ft 2 in)
- Weight: 82 kg (181 lb)

Volleyball information
- Position: libero

Career
Years	Teams
1997–2000; 2000–2001; 2001–2003; 2003–2009; 2009–2010; 2010–2011; 2011–2012; 2012–2015; 2015–2016; 2016–2019; 2019–2020; 2020–2021	(Greece) G.S. Petroupolis (Greece) Ionikos Nikaias (Greece) A.E. Nikaia (Greece) Panathinaikos (Greece) Olympiacos (Greece) E.A. Patras (Greece) Iraklis (Greece) Olympiacos (Greece) Kifissia (Greece) Olympiacos (Greece) PAOK (Greece) Panathinaikos

National team
2003–2018	Greece (212)

Georgios Stefanou (born 12 January 1981) is a Greek volleyball player. He was part of the Greece men's national volleyball team. He competed for the national team at the 2004 Summer Olympics in Athens, Greece. He most notably played for Olympiacos and Panathinaikos.

== See also ==
- Greece at the 2004 Summer Olympics
