= Georgios Papazoglou =

Greek volleyball player (born 1973)

Personal information
- Nationality: Greek
- Born: 27 June 1973 (age 53)
- Height: 199 cm (6 ft 6 in)
- Weight: 96 kg (212 lb)
- Spike: 340 cm (134 in)
- Block: 320 cm (126 in)

Career
Years	Teams
1988-2005; 2005-2006; 2006-2008; 2008-2009; 2009-2010; 2010-2011; 2011-2015	(Greece) A.O Orestiada (Greece) Olympiacos (Greece) Lamia (Greece) E.A. Patras (Greece) Panellinios (Greece) Olympiacos (Greece) Ethnikos Alexandroupolis

National team
Greece

Georgios Papazoglou (born 27 June 1973) is a former Greek male volleyball player. He was part of the Greece men's national volleyball team. On club level he played most notably for Olympiacos, A.O Orestiada and Ethnikos Alexandroupolis.
