= Lykoudis =

Lykoudis (Greek: Λυκούδης) is a Greek surname, derived from the Greek word for wolf (Greek: λύκος, lykos).

Notable people with the surname include:

- Georgios Lykoudis (born 1964), Greek volleyball player
- John Lykoudis (1910–1980), Greek doctor
- Spyros Lykoudis (born 1945), Greek politician
- Stylianos Lykoudis (1878–1958), Greek admiral

== Likoudis ==
This surname can also be transliterated Likoudis, especially outside of Greek speaking countries.

- James Likoudis (1928–2024), Catholic author

== See also ==
- Lykoudi, Greek village
