= Neoklis =

Neoklis is a masculine Greek given name. Notable people with the name include:

- Neoklis Kazazis (1849–1936), Greek lawyer, academic and writer
- Neoklis Kyriazis (1877–1956), Cypriot historian
- Neoklis Sarris (1940–2011), Greek academic, jurist and politician
- Neoklis Sylikiotis (born 1959), Cypriot politician
