= Jorge Elgueta =

Argentine volleyball player and coach

Personal information
- Nationality: Argentine
- Born: 21 November 1969 (age 56)
- Height: 1.96 m (6 ft 5 in)
- Weight: 96 kg (212 lb)
- Spike: 353 cm (139 in)
- Block: 333 cm (131 in)

Coaching information
Previous teams coached
Years	Teams
2010–2012; 2012–2014; 2014; 2015–2016; 2017; 2019–2021; 2021; 2022; 2024–	(Argentina) Sarmiento de Resistencia (Argentina) Obras de San Juan (Greece) AEK (United Arab Emirates) Al Jazira (Greece) PAOK (Argentina) Unión Vecinal de Trinidad (United Arab Emirates) Al Jazira (Argentina) Unión Vecinal de Trinidad; Bahrain

Volleyball information
- Current club: Bahrain men's national volleyball team

Career
Years	Teams
1985–1991; 1991–1993; 1993–1995; 1995–1996; 1996–1998; 1998–1999; 1999–2000; 2001–2002; 2002–2003; 2003–2004; 2004–2005; 2005–2006; 2006; 2006–2007; 2008–2010	(Argentina) Obras de San Juan (Germany) TuS Kriftel (Argentina) Chacarita de Azul (Brazil) Frangosul/Ginástica (Spain) Unicaja Almería (Italy) Caffé Motta Salerno (Italy) Carifano Fano (Greece) Orestiada (Greece) A.E. Nikaia (Spain) Espi Pòrtol (Argentina) Obras de San Juan (Greece) E.A. Patras (Puerto Rico) Gigantes de Carolina (Greece) Olympiacos (Argentina) Le Unión de Formosa

National team
1994–2007	Argentina

Jorge Elgueta (born 21 November 1969) is a former Argentine male volleyball player and current coach. He was part of the Argentina men's national volleyball team. He competed with the national team at the 1996 Summer Olympics in Atlanta, USA and at the 2004 Summer Olympics in Athens, Greece.

== See also ==
- Argentina at the 2004 Summer Olympics
