= Manos Xenakis =

Greek volleyball player

Personal information
- Nationality: Greek
- Born: 11 August 1978 (age 48); Glyfada, Athens
- Height: 196 cm (6 ft 5 in)
- Weight: 90 kg (198 lb)

Volleyball information
- Position: Outside hitter

Career
Years	Teams
1996–1999; 1999–2001; 2001–2004; 2006–2007; 2007–2009	(Greece) Olympiacos (Greece) Aris Nikaias (Greece) Olympiacos (Greece) Ethnikos (Greece) Foinikas Syros

Manos Xenakis (Greek: Μάνος Ξενάκης, born 11 August 1978) is a retired Greek male indoor volleyball and beach volleyball player. As an indoor volleyball player, he played most notably for Olympiacos for six years, with whom he won 4 Greek Championships, 3 Greek Cups and the silver medal in the 2002 CEV Champions League, As a beach volleyball player he has won a record 7 Greek Championships and has 47 FIVB Beach Volleyball World Tour participations, with his best results being the 9th place in the 2005 FIVB World Tour (Athens OPEN) and the 7th place in FIVB Satellite 2006 in Brno (both with partner Thanasis Michalopoulos). He also has 8 CEV European Tour participations, finishing first (1st) in the CEV Satellite 2010 in Geroskipou, Cyprus (with partner Giorgos Kotsilianos).
