= Olympiacos SFP (men's volleyball) =

Greek volleyball club

Olympiacos ONEX
- Nickname: Thrylos (The Legend); Erythrolefkoi (The Red-Whites)
- Founded: 1926
- Ground: Melina Merkouri Indoor Hall (Capacity: 3,000)
- Chairman: Michalis Kountouris
- Manager: (Italy) Alberto Giuliani
- League: A1 Greek Volleyleague; CEV Champions League
- 2025–26: 4th
- Website: Club home page
- Championships: 2 CEV Cups; 1 CEV Challenge Cup; 32 Greek Volleyleague Championships; 18 Greek Cups; 8 Greek League Cups; 4 Greek Super Cups

Uniforms
Home	Away

Olympiacos Men's Volleyball (Greek: Ολυμπιακός, [olimbiaˈkos]), commonly referred to as Olympiacos, Olympiacos Piraeus or with its full name as Olympiacos SFP ONEX, is the men's professional volleyball department of the major Greek multi-sport club, Olympiacos SFP, based in Piraeus, Attica. The department was founded in 1926 and their home ground is the Melina Merkouri Indoor Hall in Agios Ioannis Rentis, Piraeus.

Olympiacos is the most successful club in Greek volleyball history, having won 32 Greek Volley League titles, 19 Cups, 8 League Cups, all national records, and 4 Super Cups. They are the only volleyball team in Greece to have won a European title, having actually won 3 European titles, 2 CEV Cups in 1996 and 2005 and 1 CEV Challenge Cup in 2023. Olympiacos is a historic dominant force in European volleyball, having played in 8 European finals in all three main CEV competitions: 2 times runners-up in the CEV Champions League in 1992 and 2002 (with 7 CEV Champions League final four participations), 2 times winners (1996, 2005) and 2 times runners-up (1997, 1998) in the CEV Cup, one-time winners (2023) and one-time runners-up (2018) in the CEV Challenge Cup.

Domestically, Olympiacos holds the record for the most consecutive championships won, with eight in a row (1987–1994), and for winning seven championships undefeated (1968, 1974, 1979, 1981, 1988, 1991, 2018). Internationally, their most successful period was between 1992 and 2005, when they came to be included amongst the top volleyball powers in Europe. During this period, apart from their two European trophies, they progressed to eleven final fours in total, seven of them consecutive between 1992 and 1998 (the first four in the CEV Champions League and the next three in the CEV Cup Winners' Cup); they also won a fourth place in the CEV Super Cup and a third in the FIVB Volleyball Men's Club World Championship. Olympiacos came to European prominence again by playing in the 2017–18 CEV Challenge Cup final; at the same time, the women's department won their respective 2017–18 CEV Women's Challenge Cup. In this way, Olympiacos became the first volleyball club that had men and women playing simultaneously in European finals, and one of the very few to have won European trophies in both departments. In 2023, they won the CEV Challenge Cup, beating rivals Panathinaikos in the semi-finals and Maccabi Tel Aviv in the final.

The men's volleyball department has traditionally received strong home support, reflecting the broader popularity of Olympiacos in Greece.Apart from some Greek players such as Marios Giourdas, Giorgos Ntrakovits, Sakis Moustakidis, Vasilis Kournetas, Antonis Tsakiropoulos, Kostas Christofidelis and Mitar Tzourits, Olympiacos has also attracted over the years foreign world-class players including Ivan Miljković, Lorenzo Bernardi, Jeff Stork, Marcos Milinkovic, Bengt Gustafsson, Raimonds Vilde, Vasa Mijić, Tom Hoff, Goran Vujević, Henk-Jan Held, Osvaldo Hernández, Fabian Drzyzga and Dragan Travica.

== Honours ==
=== Continental Competitions ===
- CEV Champions League
  - Runners-up (2): 1991−92, 2001−02
  - 3rd place (2): 1992–93, 1994–95
  - 4th place (3): 1981–82, 1993–94, 2000–01
- CEV Cup
  - Winners (2): 1995−96, 2004−05
  - Runners-up (2): 1996−97, 1997−98
  - Semifinals (1): 2018–19
- CEV Challenge Cup
  - Winners (1): 2022–23
  - Runners-up (1): 2017–18
- CEV Super Cup
  - 4th place (1): 1996

=== Worldwide Competitions ===
- FIVB Club World Championship
  - 3rd place (1): 1992

=== Domestic competitions ===
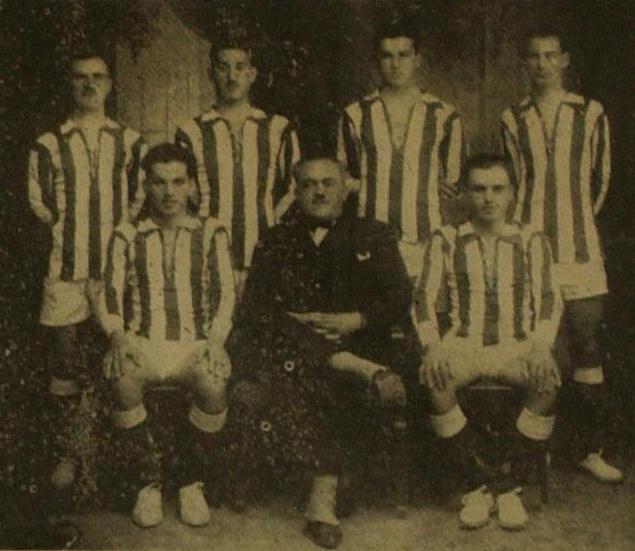
Olympiacos first volleyball team in 1926

- Greek League

Winners (32) (record): 1967−68, 1968−69, 1973−74, 1975−76, 1977−78, 1978−79, 1979−80, 1980−81, 1982−83, 1986−87, 1987−88, 1988−89, 1989−90, 1990−91, 1991−92, 1992−93, 1993−94, 1997−98, 1998−99, 1999−00, 2000−01, 2002−03, 2008−09, 2009−10, 2010−11, 2012−13, 2013−14, 2017−18, 2018−19, 2020−21, 2022−23, 2023−24

- Greek Cup

Winners (18) (record): 1980−81, 1982−83, 1988−89, 1989−90, 1991−92, 1992−93, 1996−97, 1997−98, 1998−99, 2000−01, 2008−09, 2010−11, 2012−13, 2013−14, 2015−16, 2016−17, 2023−24, 2024−25

- Melina Mercouri Cup

Winners (1) (record):1993-94*

- Greek League Cup

Winners (8) (record): 2012−13, 2014−15, 2015−16, 2016−17, 2017−18, 2018−19, 2024–25, 2025–26

- Greek Super Cup

Winners (4) (shared record): 2000, 2010, 2024, 2025

Note:
• In 1994, the Greek Cup was cancelled and a final 4 tournament was held in memory of Melina Merkouri. The international players were absent due to the 1994 World Championship. In the final Olympiacos Piraeus defeated Aris Thessaloniki 3–0 to win the title which does count as the cup title for that year according to the Hellenic Volleyball Federation

=== Individual club awards ===
- Double
  - Winners (15) (record): 1980−81, 1982−83, 1988−89, 1989−90, 1991−92, 1992−93, 1993−94, 1997−98, 1998−99, 2000−01, 2008−09, 2010−11, 2012−13, 2013−14, 2023−24

== International record ==
Season	Achievement	Notes
CEV Champions League
1981–82	Final Four	4th place in a group with Robe di Kappa Torino, CSKA Moscow and Dinamo București
1991–92	Final	won 3–0 against CSKA Moscow in the semi-final, lost 0–3 to il Messaggero Ravenna in the final
1992–93	Final Four	3rd place. Lost 1–3 to Maxicono Parma in the semi-final, won 3–0 against Maes Pils Zellik in the 3rd place game
1993–94	Final Four	4th place. Lost 0–3 to Maxicono Parma in the semi-final, lost 0–3 to Maes Pils Zellik in the 3rd place game
1994–95	Final Four	3rd place. Lost 1–3 to Edilcuoghi Ravenna in the semi-final, won 3–2 against Maes Pils Zellik in the 3rd place game
2000–01	Final Four	4th place. Lost 0–3 to Sisley Treviso in the semi-final, lost 2–3 to Ford B. Gesu Roma in the 3rd place game
2001–02	Final	won 3–1 against Mostostal in the semi-final, lost 1–3 to Lube Banca Macerata in the final
2009–10	Playoff 6	5th place. Eliminated by Dynamo Moscow, 1–3 loss in Moscow, 1–3 loss in Piraeus
CEV Cup Winners Cup / CEV Top Teams Cup / CEV Cup
1995–96	Winners	won 3–1 against Alcom Capelle in the semi-final, won 3–2 against Bayer Wuppertal in the final
1996–97	Final	won 3–1 against Berlin in the semi-final, lost 0–3 to Alpitour Traco Cuneo in the final
1997–98	Final	won 3–0 against Castêlo da Maia in the semi-final, lost 0–3 to Alpitour Traco Cuneo in the final
2004–05	Winners	won 3–0 against Dukla Liberec in the semi-final, won 3–0 against Ortec Nesselande Rotterdam in the final
2018–19	Semi-finals	Eliminated by Diatec Trentino, 0–3 loss in Piraeus, 1–3 loss in Trento
FIVB Volleyball Men's Club World Championship
1992	Final Four	3rd place. Lost 0–3 to Misura Milano in the semi-final, won 3–0 against il Messaggero Ravenna in the 3rd place game
CEV European Super Cup
1996	Final Four	4th place. Lost 1–3 to Dachau in the semi-final, lost 0–3 against Daytona Modena in the 3rd place game
CEV Challenge Cup
2017–18	Final	defeated by Bunge Ravenna, 1–3 loss in Ravenna, 1–3 loss in Piraeus
2022–23	Winners	won 5–4 against Panathinaikos in the semi-finals, won 6–0 against Maccabi Tel Aviv in the finals

== The road to 3 CEV European titles ==
=== The road to 2 CEV Cups victories ===
==== 1996 CEV Cup Winners' Cup victory ====
Round	Team	Home	Away
Group Stage (Group B)	(Czech Republic) VK Dukla Liberec		1–3
Group Stage (Group B)	(Belgium) Desimpel Torhout	3–0	
Group Stage (Group B)	(Ukraine) Lokomotyv Kharkiv		0–3
Group Stage (Group B)	(Poland) Legia Warsaw	3–0	
Group Stage (Group B)	(Russia) Belogorie Belgorod		3–0
Group Stage (Group B)	(Germany) Bayer Wuppertal	3–0	
Group Stage (Group B)	(Turkey) Eczacıbaşı Istanbul		0–3
Semifinal	(Netherlands) Alcom Capelle	3–1	
Final	(Germany) Bayer Wuppertal	3–2	

==== 2005 CEV Top Teams Cup victory ====
Round	Team	Home	Away
Qualification Round (Group 7)	(North Macedonia) Rabotnicki Skopje	3–0	
Qualification Round (Group 7)	(Cyprus) Pafiakos Pafos	3–0	
Qualification Round (Group 7)	(Bosnia and Herzegovina) Brčko Brčko	3–0	
Group Stage (Group A)	(Slovenia) Šoštanj Topolšica	3–0	0–3
Group Stage (Group A)	(Switzerland) Concordia Näfels	3–0	0–3
Group Stage (Group A)	(Turkey) Fenerbahçe Istanbul	3–0	1–3
Quarterfinal	(Turkey) Ziraat Bankası Ankara	3–0	0–3
Semifinal	(Czech Republic) VK Dukla Liberec	3–0	
Final	(Netherlands) Ortec Nesselande Rotterdam	3–0	

=== The road to the CEV Challenge Cup victory ===
==== 2023 CEV Challenge Cup victory ====
Round	Team	Home	Away
Round of 32	(Slovakia) Spartak Komárno	3–0	1–3
Round of 16	(Bulgaria) Burgas	3–0	3–2
Quarterfinals	(Romania) Steaua Bucuresti	3–1	2–3
Semifinals	(Greece) Panathinaikos Athens	1–3	1–4 (Golden Set)
Finals	(Israel) Maccabi Tel Aviv	3–0	0–3

== Supporters ==
Olympiacos volleyball logo

Olympiacos fans are renowned for their passionate support to the team, with the atmosphere at home matches regarded as intense to an extent rarely seen in volleyball matches. In the decade of the 1900s and the early 2000s, Olympiacos was among the top powers in European volleyball. Olympiacos had 7 consecutive European Final Four participations, four in the CEV Champions League –1992, 1993, 1994, 1995– and three in the CEV Cup Winners' Cup –1996, 1997, 1998–, winners of the 1996 CEV Cup Winners' Cup, twice Runners-up of the CEV Champions League in 1992 and 2002, twice Runners-up of the CEV Cup Winners' Cup in 1997 and 1998, third place in the world in the FIVB Volleyball Men's Club World Championship in 1992 and fourth place in the 1996 CEV European Super Cup, and was considered one of the best supported volleyball teams in Europe.

In the 1992 CEV Champions League Final Four in Piraeus, an estimated 20,000 Olympiacos fans crowded the Peace and Friendship Stadium for the semi-final against CSKA Moscow and 20,000 more for the final against il Messaggero Ravenna. Volleyball legend Karch Kiraly, Hall of Famer and three times Olympic gold medalist, a key member of il Messaggero Ravenna at the time, talked about the 1992 CEV Champions League Final in a 2018 interview: "That particular CEV Champions League Final Four in Piraeus was really a very special experience. Even now as we speak, the first thing that comes to my mind was the unbelievable atmposhere that we all lived in that volleyball game in Athens 26 years ago. In that day I cherished the Greek supporters and the passion of Olympiacos fans for volleyball. It was something unique."

In the 1996 CEV Cup Winners' Cup Final Four which was held again in Piraeus and the Peace and Friendship Stadium, an estimated 18,000 to 20,000 Olympiacos fans filed into SEF and created the most intense atmosphere, pushing the team to their first ever European title against the German side Bayer Wuppertal, after a hard-fought 3–2 win. After the victory, hundreds of ecstatic Olympiacos fans stormed the court and celebrated the title with the players.

Olympiacos hosted the Final Four of the CEV Top Teams Cup in 2005 and Olympiacos supporters relived some of the 1990s moments. 15,000 fans packed the Peace and Friendship Stadium and provided once again an electric atmosphere, helping Olympiacos to win their second European title, after a 3–0 win against the Dutch side Ortec Nesselande Rotterdam in the final.

In 2018 Peace and Friendship Stadium lived once again some of its timeless glory, as an estimated 12,000 Olympiacos fans created an extraordinary atmosphere in the final of the 2017–18 CEV Challenge Cup against Bunge Ravenna. Ravenna's Austrian star Paul Buchegger talked about the atmosphere in the post-game interview: "The atmosphere, the fans were really great. It was a "red hell", when I entered the court I had goose bumps. I have never played in front of such a big crowd."

On 15 March 2023, 13,000 Olympiacos fans attended and cheered in a fully packed Peace and Friendship Stadium, as they helped Olympiacos win the 2022–23 CEV Challenge Cup, their third European title, after beating Maccabi Tel Aviv 3–0 in the second leg of the finals.

== Notable players ==
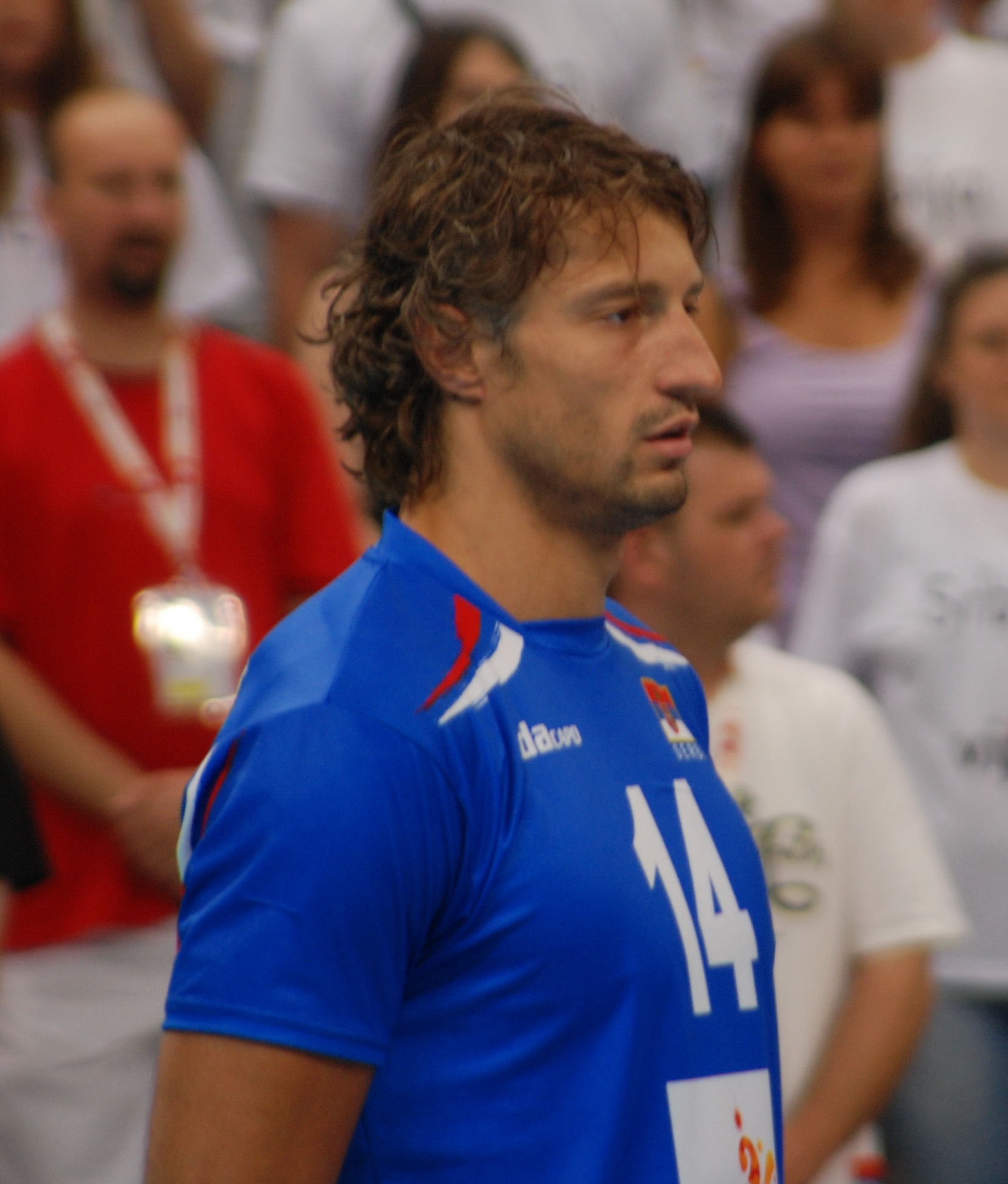
Ivan Miljković

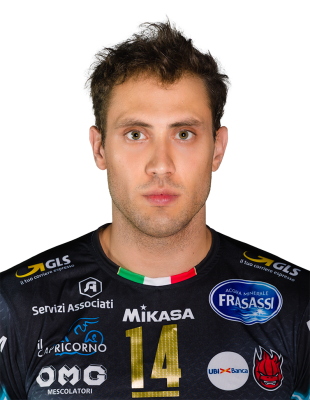
Aleksandar Atanasijević

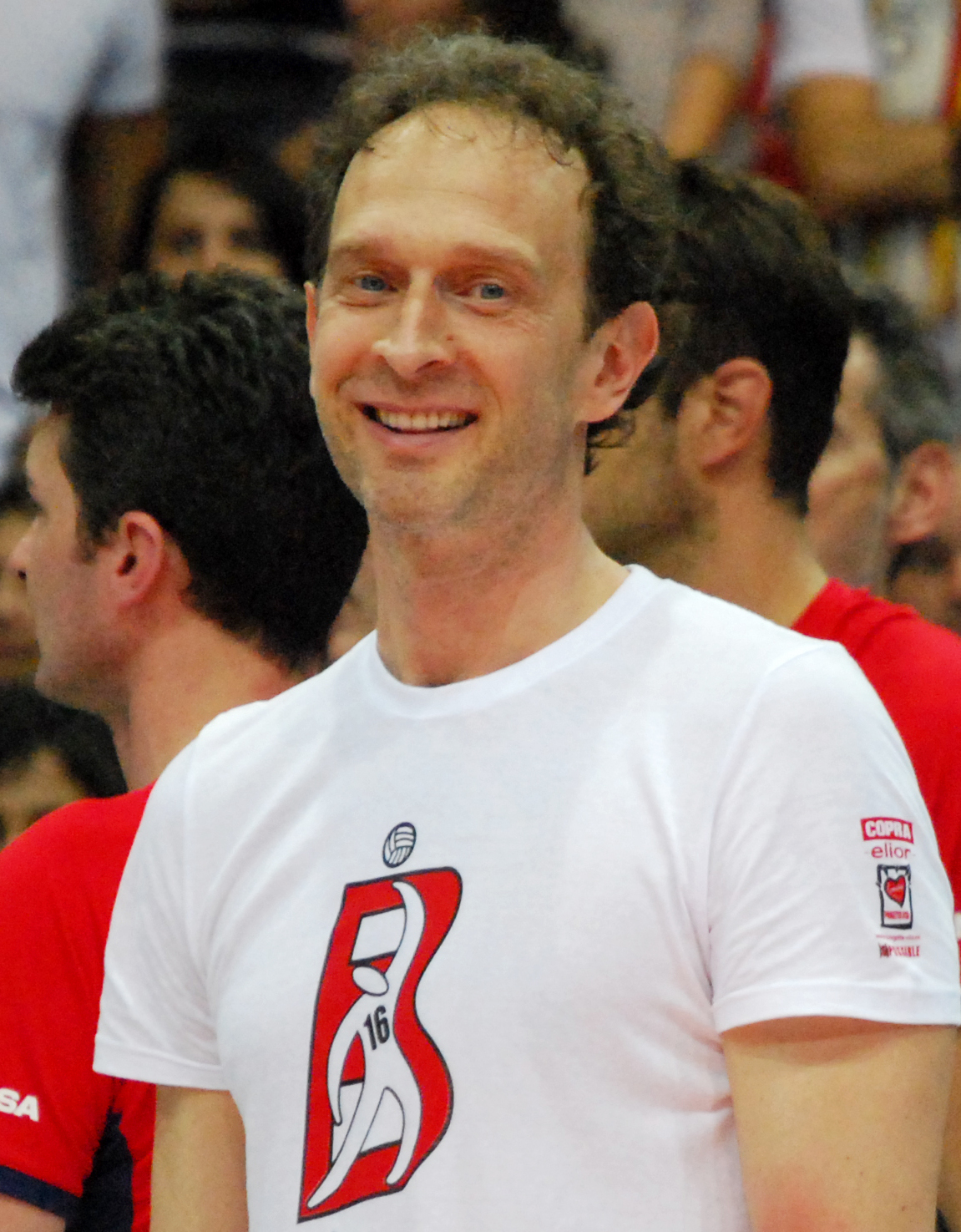
Lorenzo Bernardi

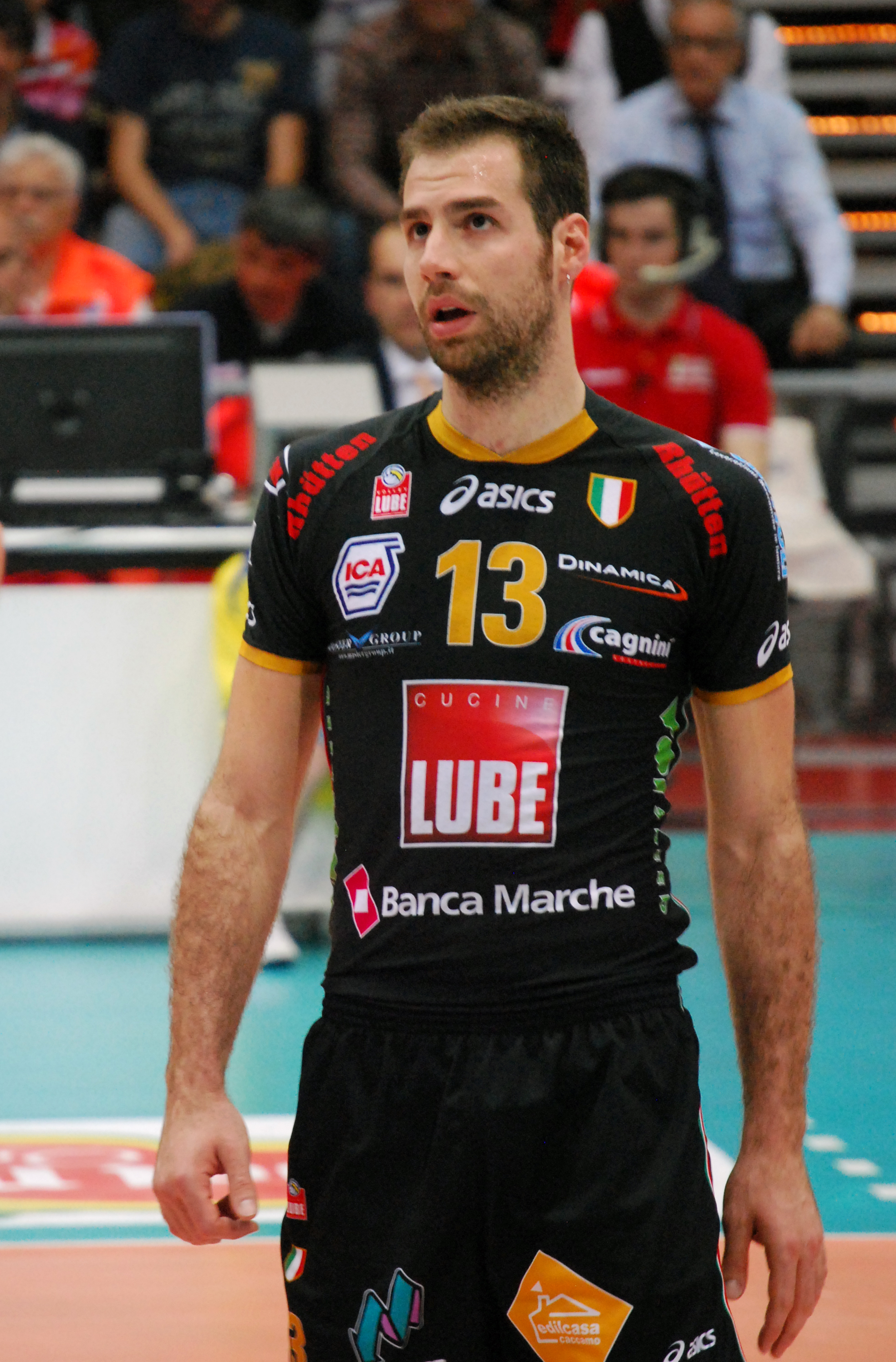
Dragan Travica

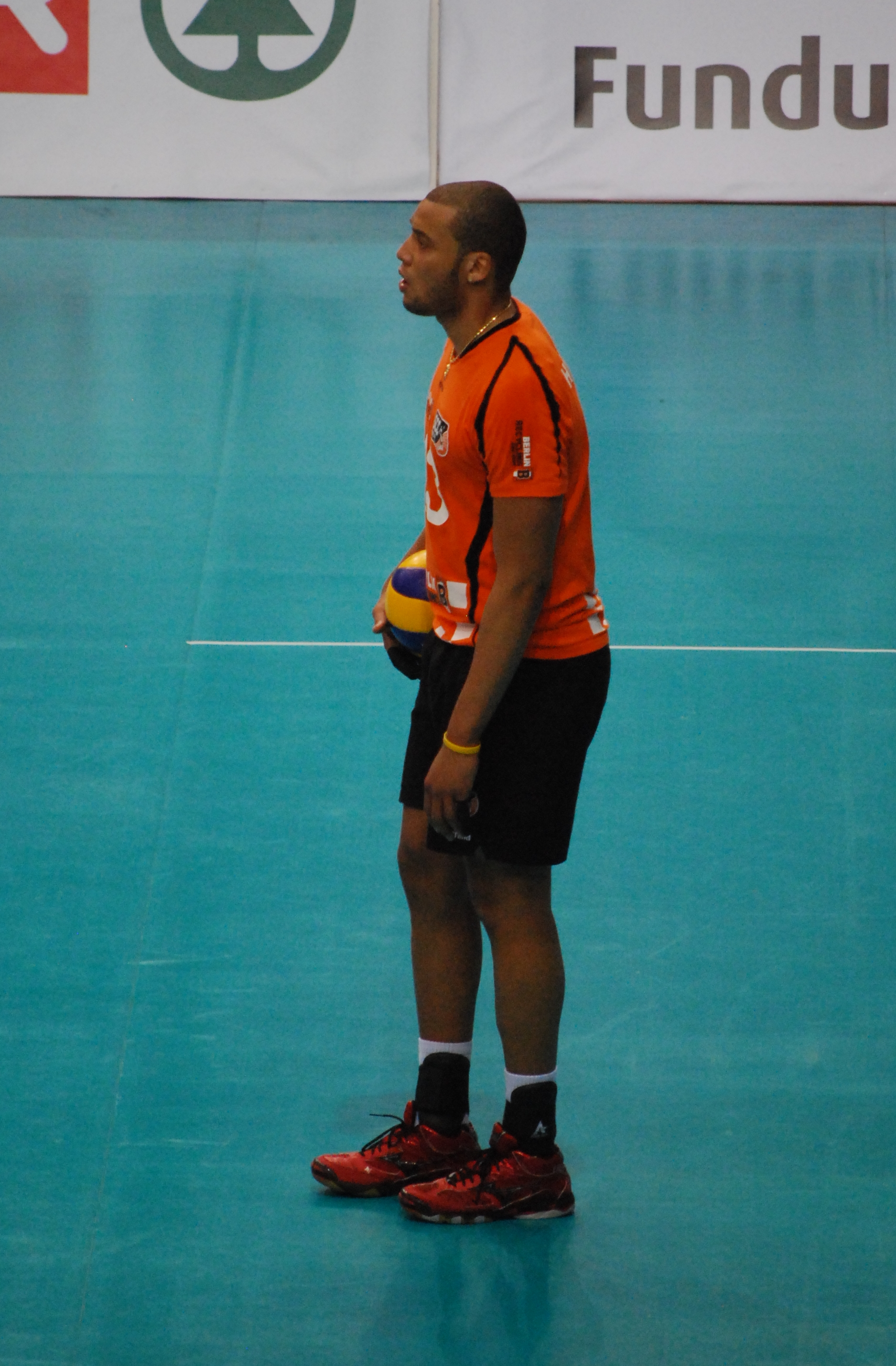
Salvador Hidalgo Oliva

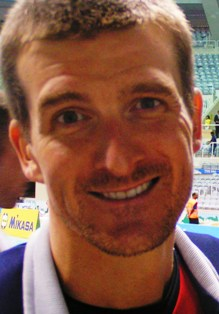
Tom Hoff

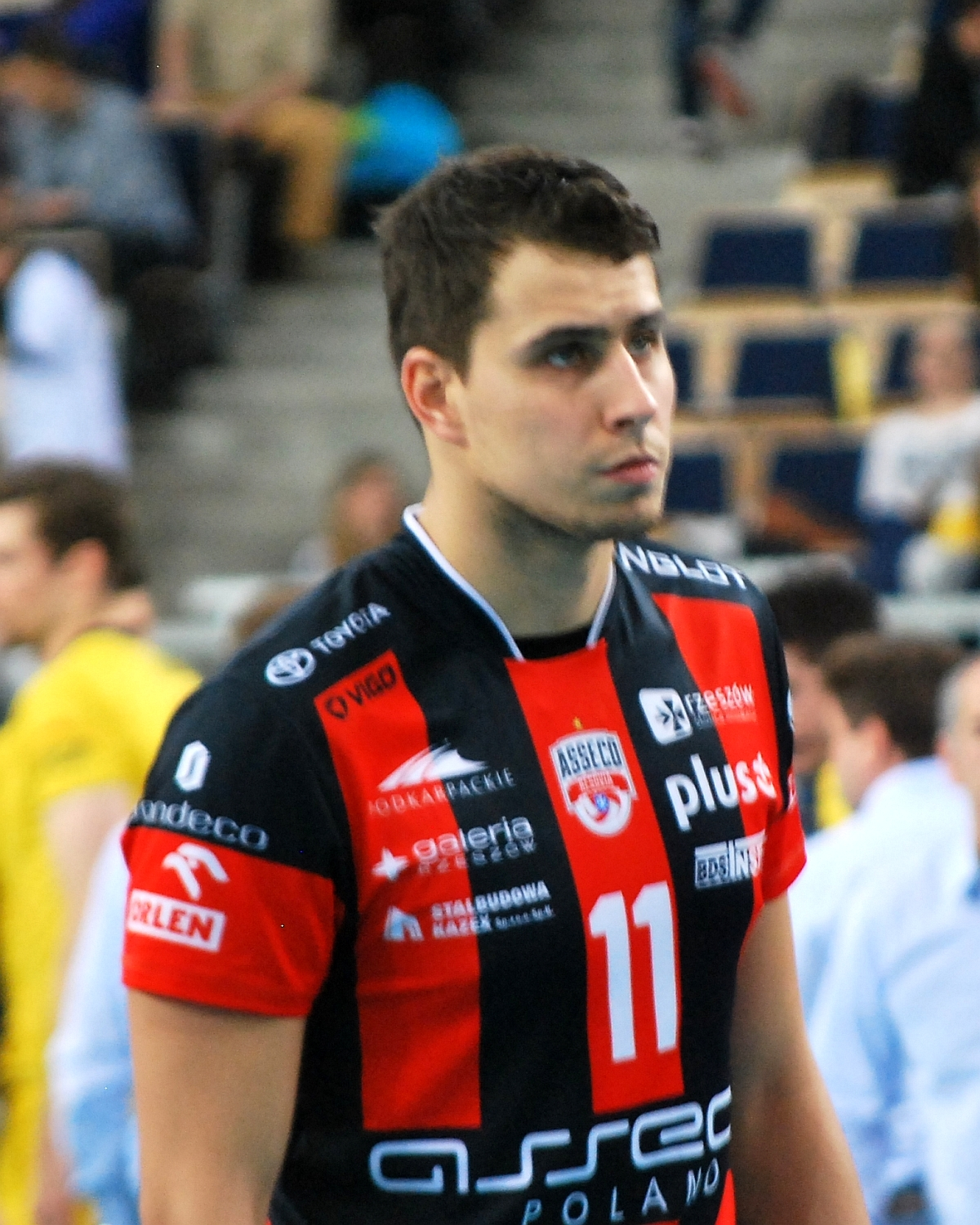
Fabian Drzyzga

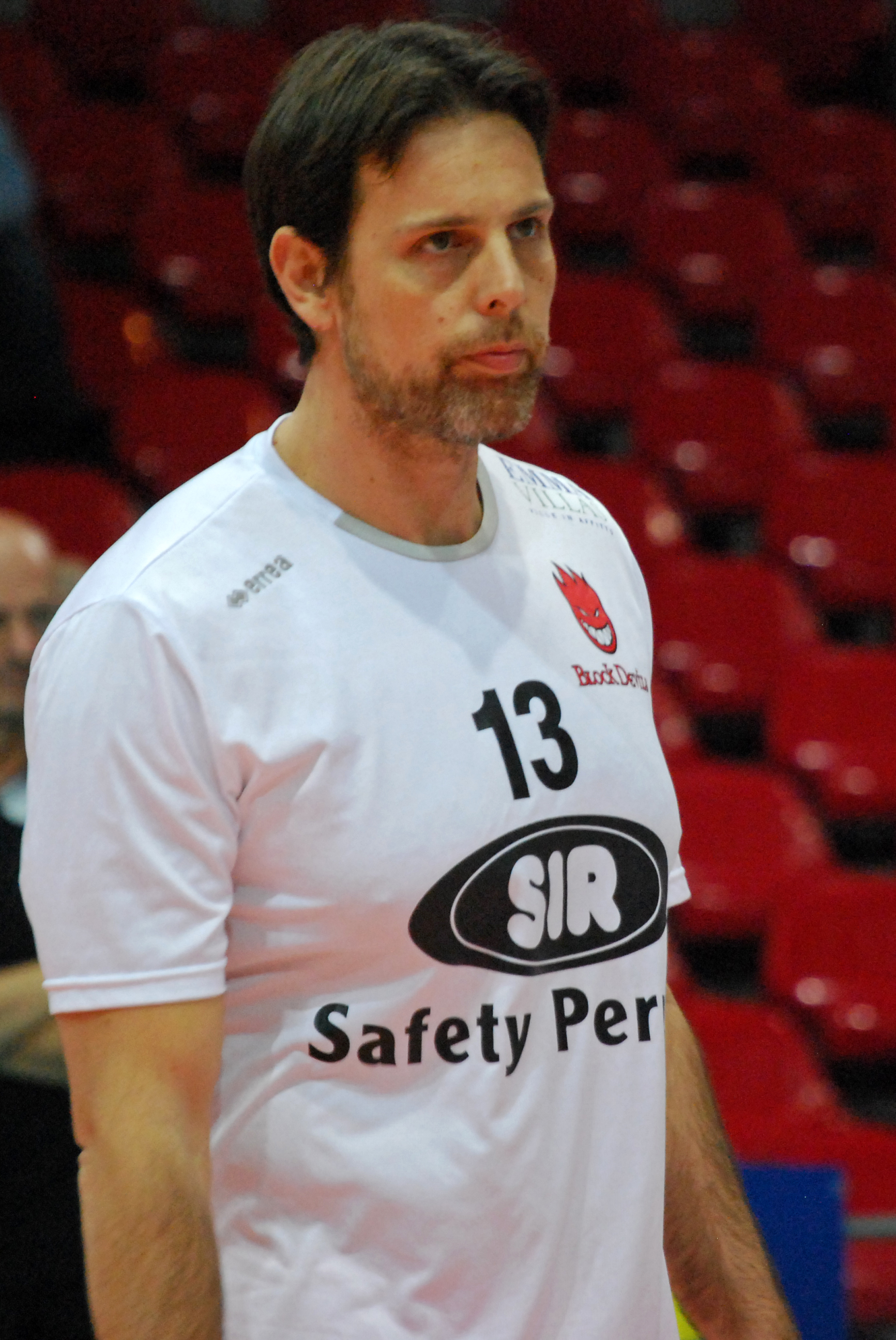
Goran Vujević

Criteria

To appear in this section a player must have either:

- Played at least one season for the club.
- Set a club record or won an individual award while at the club.
- Played at least one official international match for their national team at any time.
- To perform very successfully during period in the club or at later/previous stages of his career.

- (Greece) Michalis Alexandropoulos
- (Greece) Kaloudis Alexoudis
- (Greece) Sotiris Amarianakis
- (Greece) Andreas Andreadis
- (Greece) Christos Angelidis
- (Greece) Apostolos Armenakis
- (Greece) Theodoros Bozidis
- (Greece) Akis Chatziantoniou
- (Greece) Dimitris Chorianos
- (Greece) Kostas Christofidelis
- (Greece) Anestis Dalakouras
- (Greece) Theologos Daridis
- (Greece) Giorgos Dermatis
- (Greece) Christos Dimitrakopoulos
- (Greece) Iraklis Doriadis
- (Greece) Giorgos Dragovits
- (Greece) - (Serbia) Mitar Đurić
- (Greece) Giannis Fakas
- (Greece) - (Ukraine) Dima Filippov
- (Greece) Andreas Frangos
- (Greece) Vasilis Galakos
- (Greece) Marios Giourdas
- (Greece) Dimitrios Gkaras
- (Greece) Kostas Goudakos
- (Greece) - (Poland) Konrad Guzda
- (Greece) Makis Kanellos
- (Greece) Theoklitos Karipidis
- (Greece) Dimitris Kazazis
- (Greece) Menelaos Kokkinakis
- (Greece) Tasos Koublis
- (Greece) Rafail Koumentakis
- (Greece) Kostas Kourbetis
- (Greece) Vasilis Kournetas
- (Greece) Pavlos Kouzounis
- (Greece) Chrysanthos Kyriazis
- (Greece) Giannis Laios
- (Greece) Dimosthenis Linardos
- (Greece) Andreas Lorandos
- (Greece) Giorgos Lykoudis
- (Greece) Thanos Maroulis
- (Greece) Thanasis Michalopoulos
- (Greece) Avgoustinos Michalos
- (Greece) Dimitris Mitropoulos
- (Greece) Sakis Moustakidis
- (Greece) Kyriakos Pantelias
- (Greece) Achilleas Papadimitriou
- (Greece) Giorgos Papazoglou
- (Greece) Panagiotis Pelekoudas
- (Greece) Giorgos Petreas
- (Greece) Stefanos Polyzos
- (Greece) Stelios Prosalikas
- (Greece) Kostas Prousalis
- (Greece) Giannis Roumeliotakis
- (Greece) Nikos Roumeliotis
- (Greece) Nikos Smaragdis
- (Greece) Dimitris Soultanopoulos
- (Greece) Giorgos Stefanou
- (Greece) Kostas Stivachtis
- (Greece) Giannis Takouridis
- (Greece) Kostas Tambouratzis
- (Greece) Lefteris Terzakis
- (Greece) Andreas Theodoridis
- (Greece) Michalis Triantafyllidis
- (Greece) Antonis Tsakiropoulos
- (Greece) Paraskevas Tselios
- (Greece) Sotiris Tsergas
- (Greece) Dimitris Tziavras
- (Greece) Manos Xenakis
- (Greece) Vasilis Xerovasilas
- (Greece) Nikos Zoupanis
- (Argentina) Jorge Elgueta
- (Argentina) Pablo Meana
- (Argentina) - (Croatia) Marcos Milinkovic
- (Brazil) Gustavo Bonatto
- (Brazil) Leonardo Caldeira
- (Brazil) Athos Ferreira Costa
- (Brazil) Paulino Dirceu
- (Brazil) Luiz Felipe Fonteles
- (Bulgaria) Todor Aleksiev
- (Bulgaria) Krasimir Gaydarski
- (Bulgaria) Ivaylo Gavrilov
- (Bulgaria) Nikolay Jeliazkov
- (Bulgaria) Plamen Konstantinov
- (Bulgaria) Lyudmil Naydenov
- (Bulgaria) Dimo Tonev
- (Bulgaria) Hristo Tsvetanov
- (Bulgaria) Boyan Yordanov
- (Bulgaria) Andrey Zhekov
- (Canada) Justin Duff
- (Canada) - (England) Jason Haldane
- (Canada) John Gordon Perrin
- (Canada) Gavin Schmitt
- (Colombia) Liberman Agámez
- (Croatia) Tomislav Čošković
- (Croatia) Marko Sedlaček
- (Cuba) Rolando Despaigne
- (Cuba) Osvaldo Hernández
- (Cuba) Salvador Hidalgo Oliva
- (Cuba) Rodolfo Sánchez
- (Finland) Janne Heikkinen
- (Finland) Olli Kunnari
- (Finland) Mikko Oivanen
- (Finland) Eemi Tervaportti
- (France) Renaud Herpe
- (Germany) Marcus Böhme
- (Germany) Christian Fromm
- (Germany) Christian Pampel
- (Germany) Simon Tischer
- (Italy) Lorenzo Bernardi
- (Italy) Paolo Merlo
- (Italy) Dragan Travica
- (Latvia) Hermans Egleskalns
- (Latvia) Raimonds Vilde
- (Montenegro) Božidar Ćuk
- (Netherlands) Henk-Jan Held
- (Netherlands) Wytze Kooistra
- (Netherlands) Jeroen Rauwerdink
- (Poland) Fabian Drzyzga
- (Poland) Leszek Urbanowicz
- (Puerto Rico) José Rivera
- (Romania) Andrei Spînu
- (Russia) - (Soviet Union) Igor Runov
- (Serbia) Aleksandar Atanasijević
- (Serbia) Dejan Bojović
- (Serbia) Slobodan Boškan
- (Serbia) Dejan Brđović
- (Serbia) Konstantin Čupković
- (Serbia) - (Montenegro) Milan Jurišić
- (Serbia) - (Montenegro) Milan Marković
- (Serbia) Vasa Mijić
- (Serbia) Ivan Miljković
- (Serbia) Aleksandar Okolic
- (Serbia) Veljko Petković
- (Serbia) - (Montenegro) Goran Vujević
- (Slovakia) František Ogurčák
- (Slovenia) Alen Pajenk
- (Slovenia) Tonček Štern
- (Slovenia) Tine Urnaut
- (Sweden) Bengt Gustafson
- (Ukraine) Andrii Diachkov
- (Ukraine) Oleksiy Gatin
- (Ukraine) Igor Popov
- (United States) Carson Clark
- (United States) Scott Fortune
- (United States) Tom Hoff
- (United States) Jayson Jablonsky
- (United States) Reid Priddy
- (United States) Riley Salmon
- (United States) Jeff Stork
- (United States) Donald Suxho
- (Venezuela) Ernardo Gómez
- (Venezuela) Iván Márquez
- (Venezuela) Andy Rojas
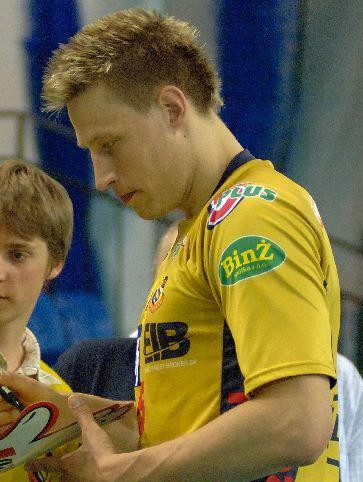
Janne Heikkinen

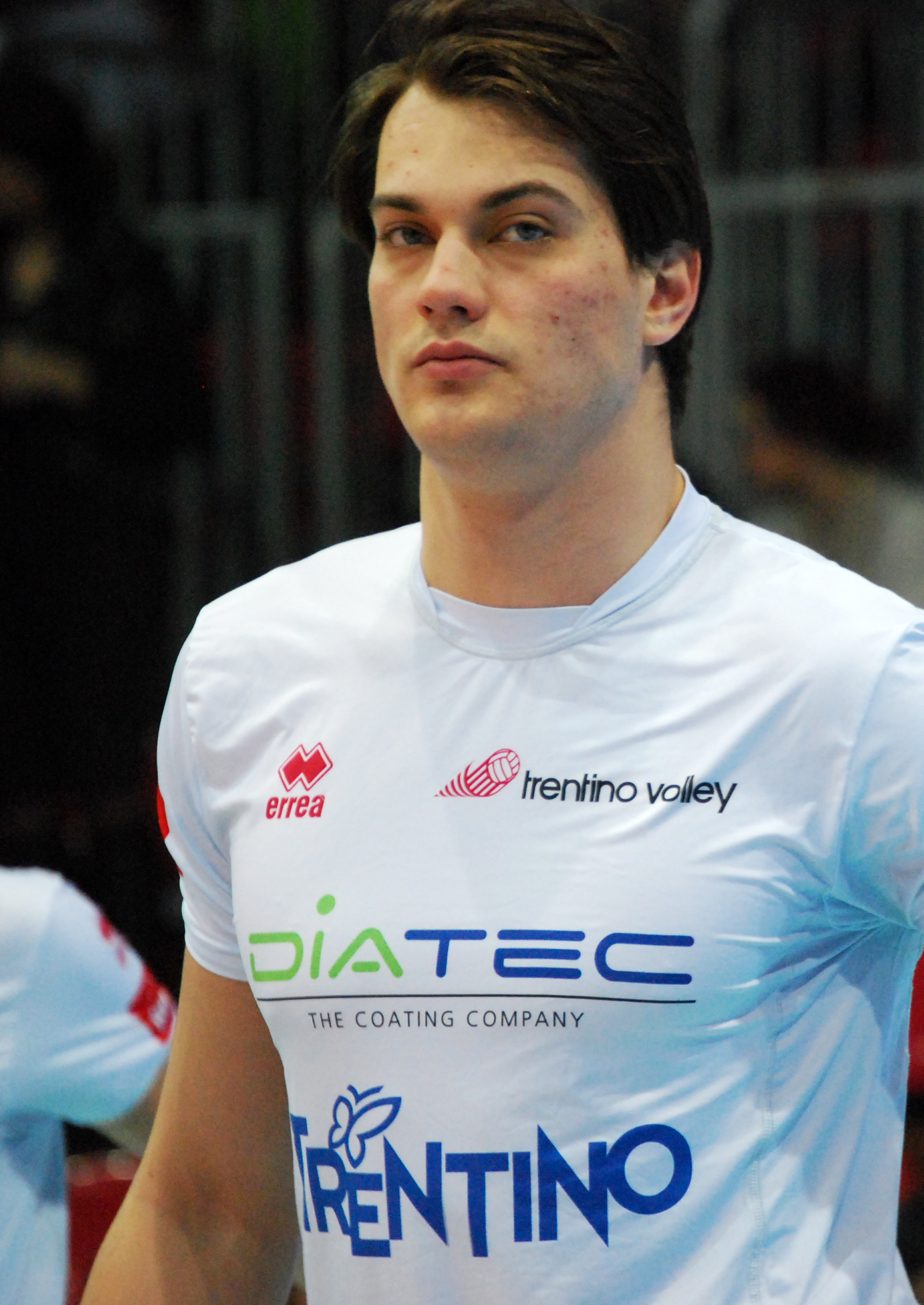
Mitar Đurić

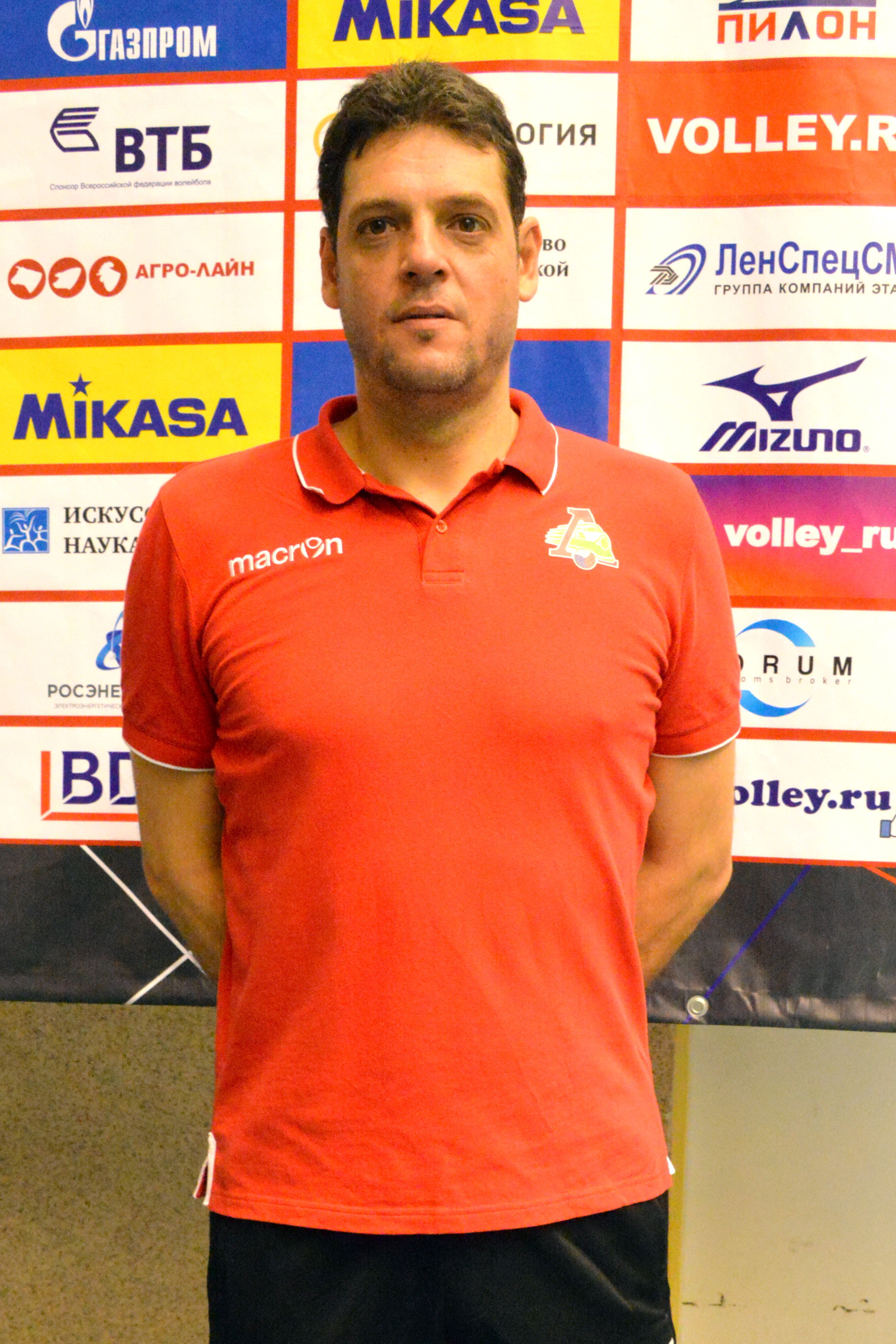
Plamen Konstantinov

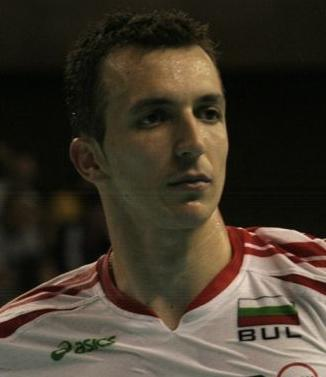
Boyan Yordanov

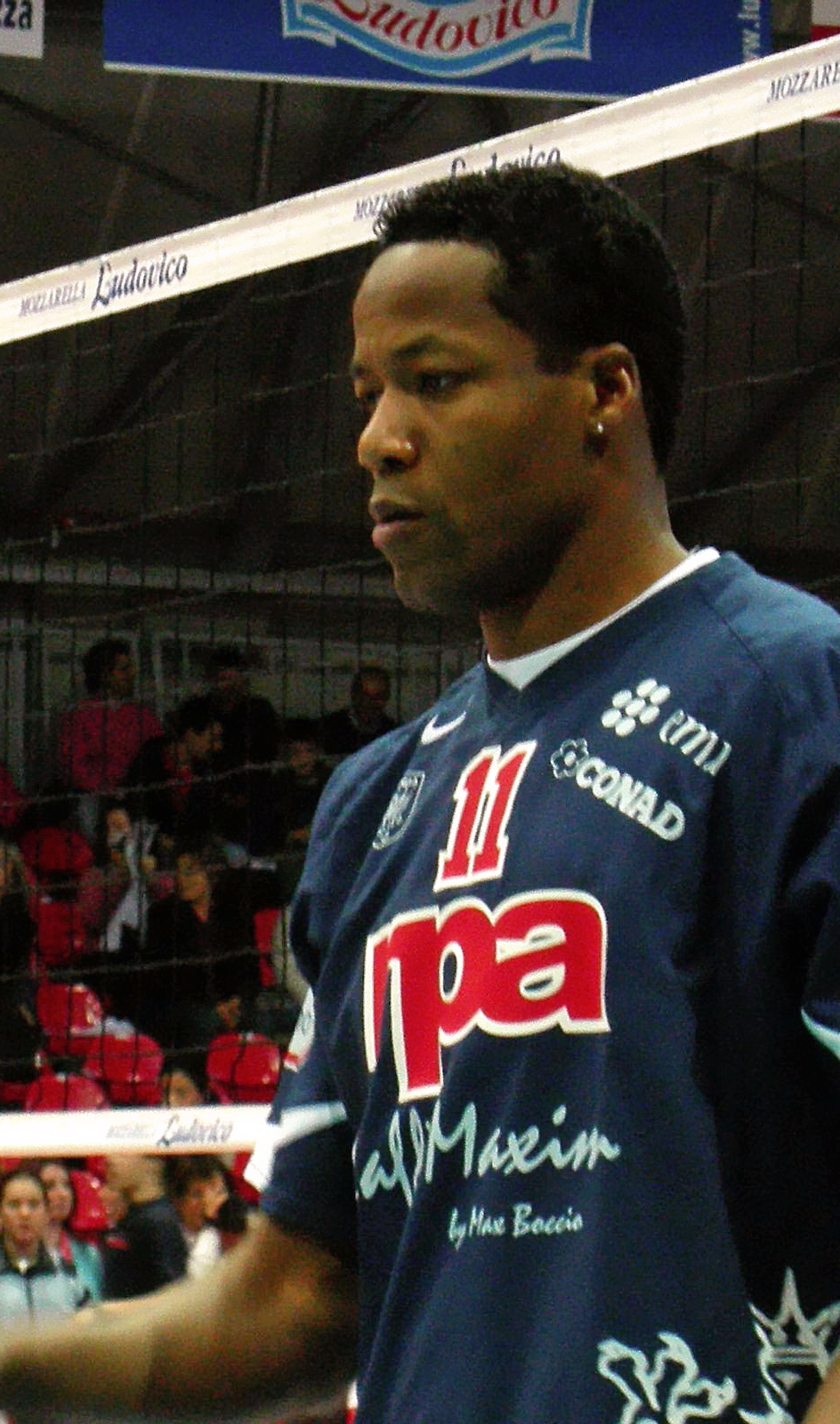
Osvaldo Hernández

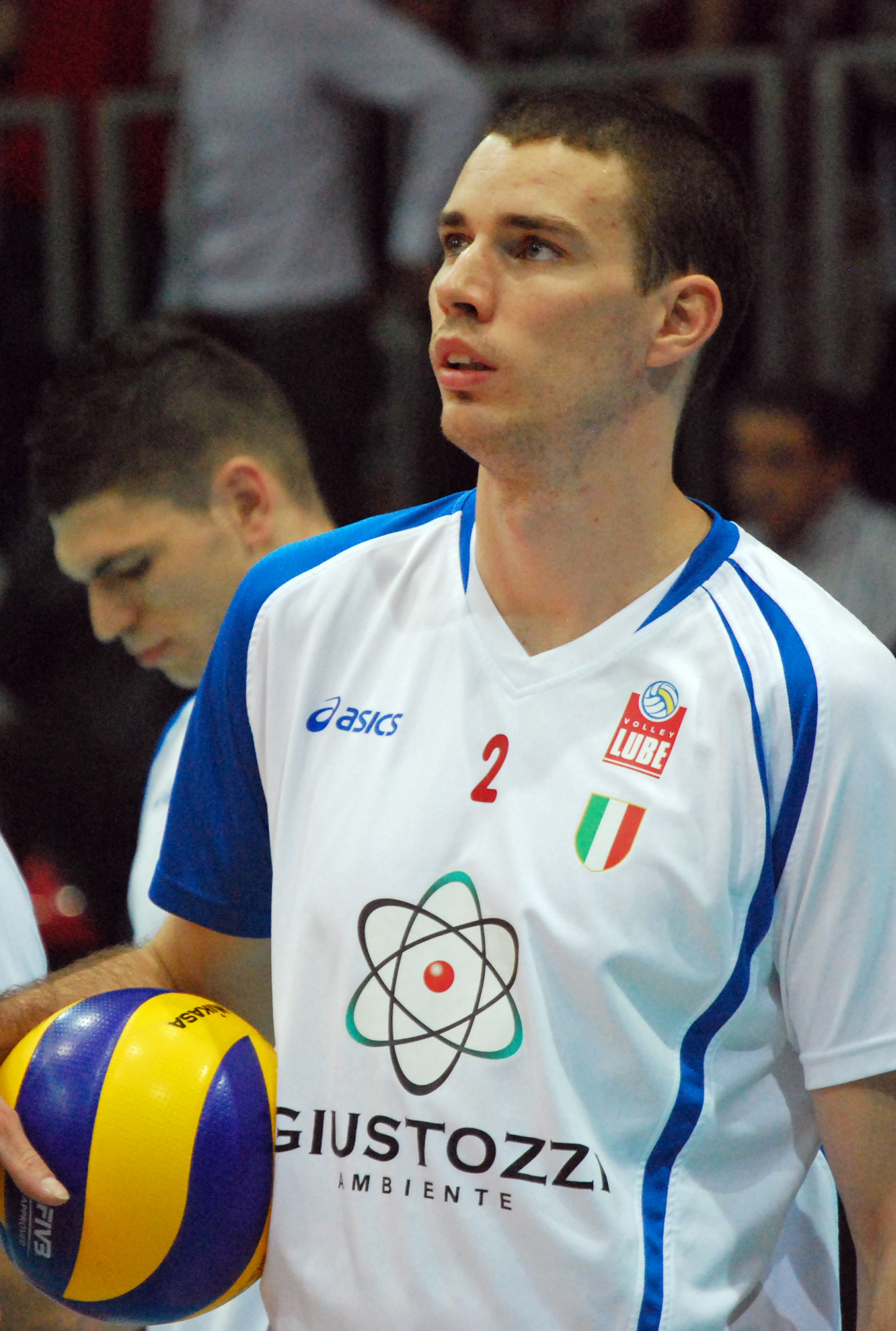
Alen Pajenk

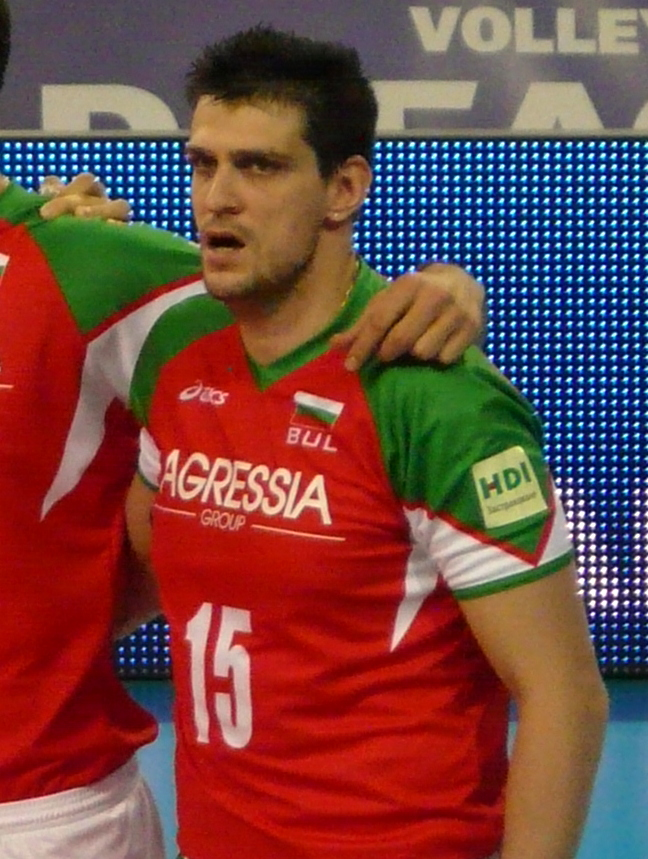
Todor Aleksiev

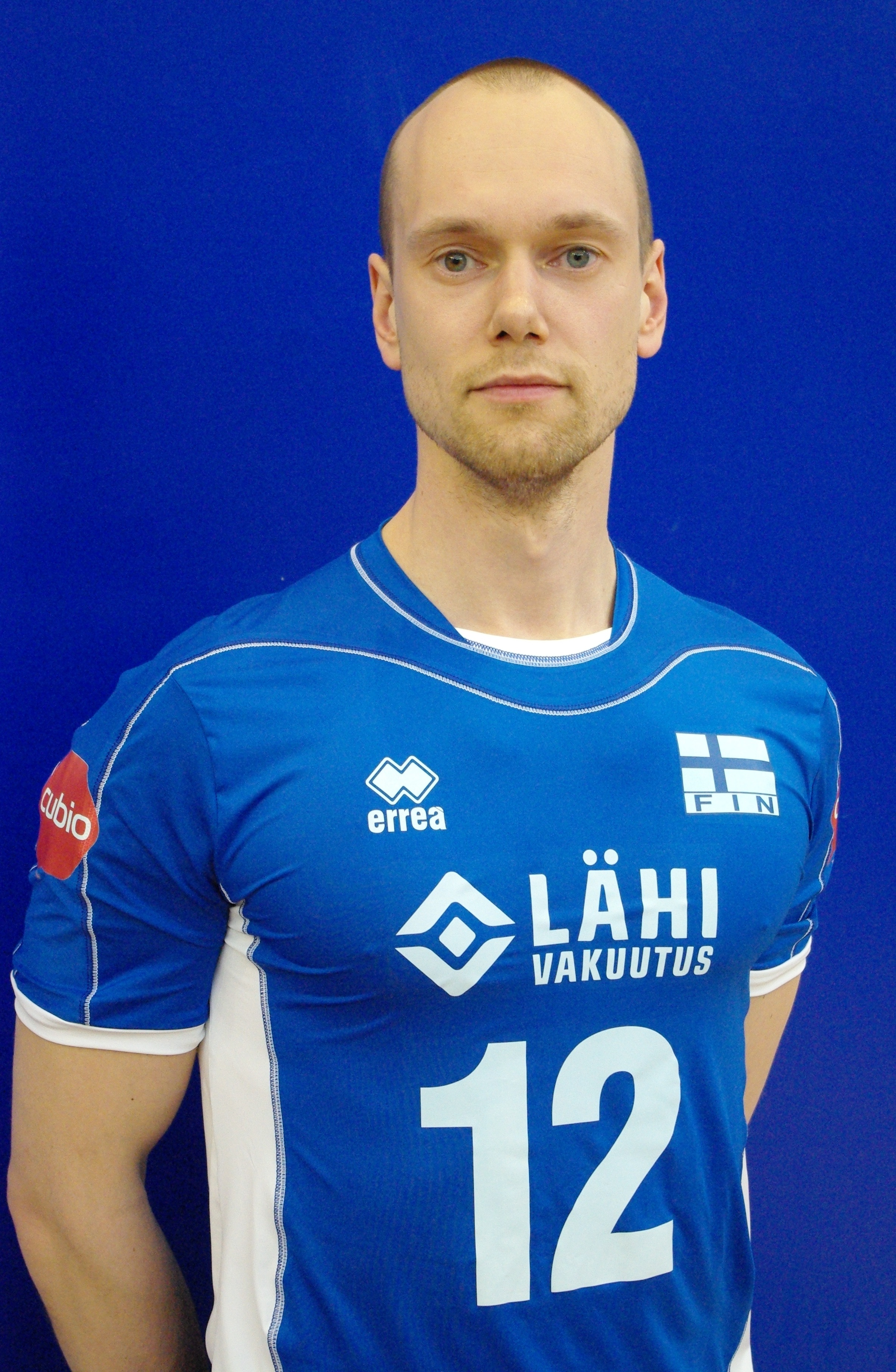
Olli Kunnari

== Notable coaches ==
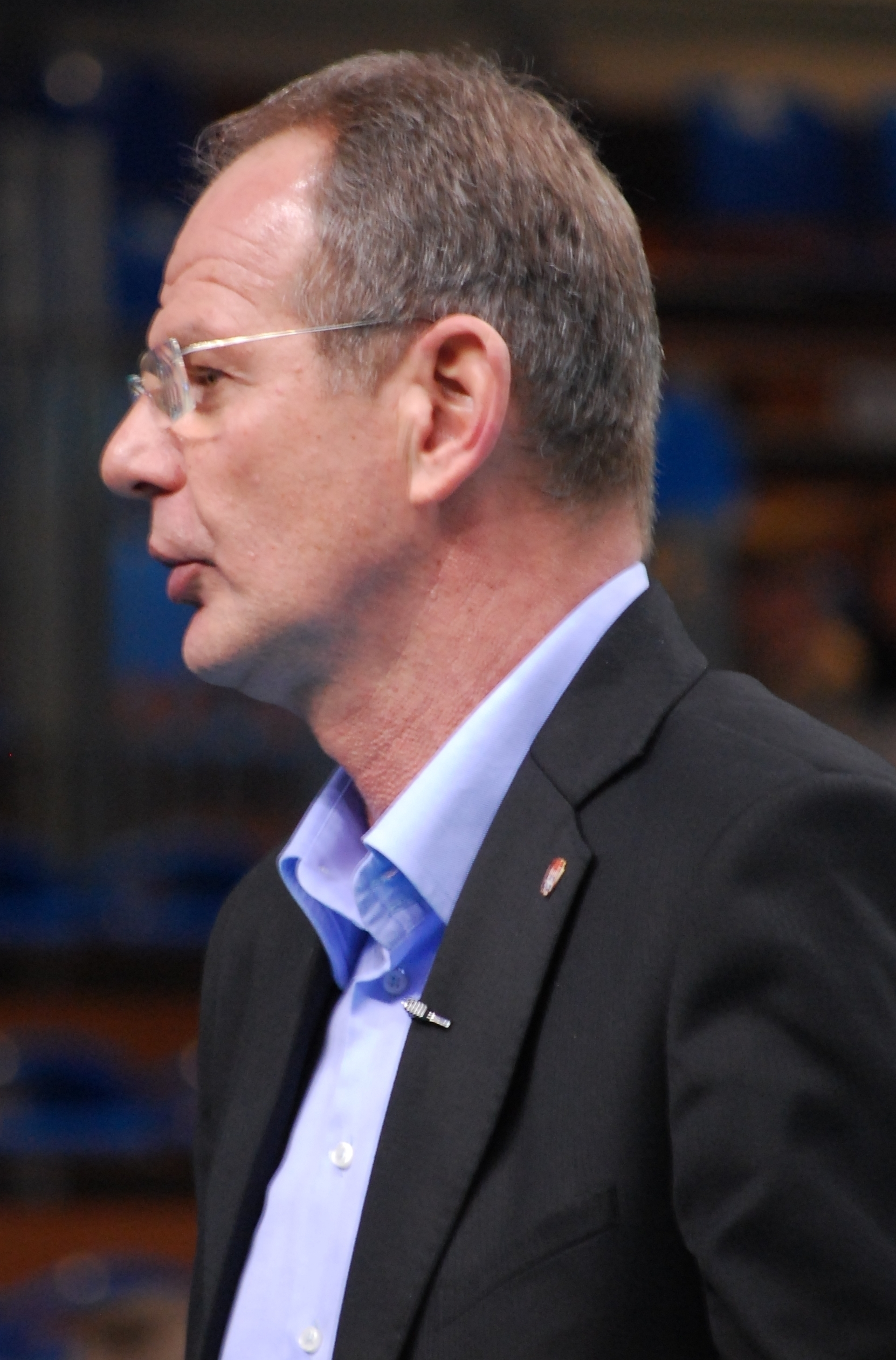
Ljubomir Travica

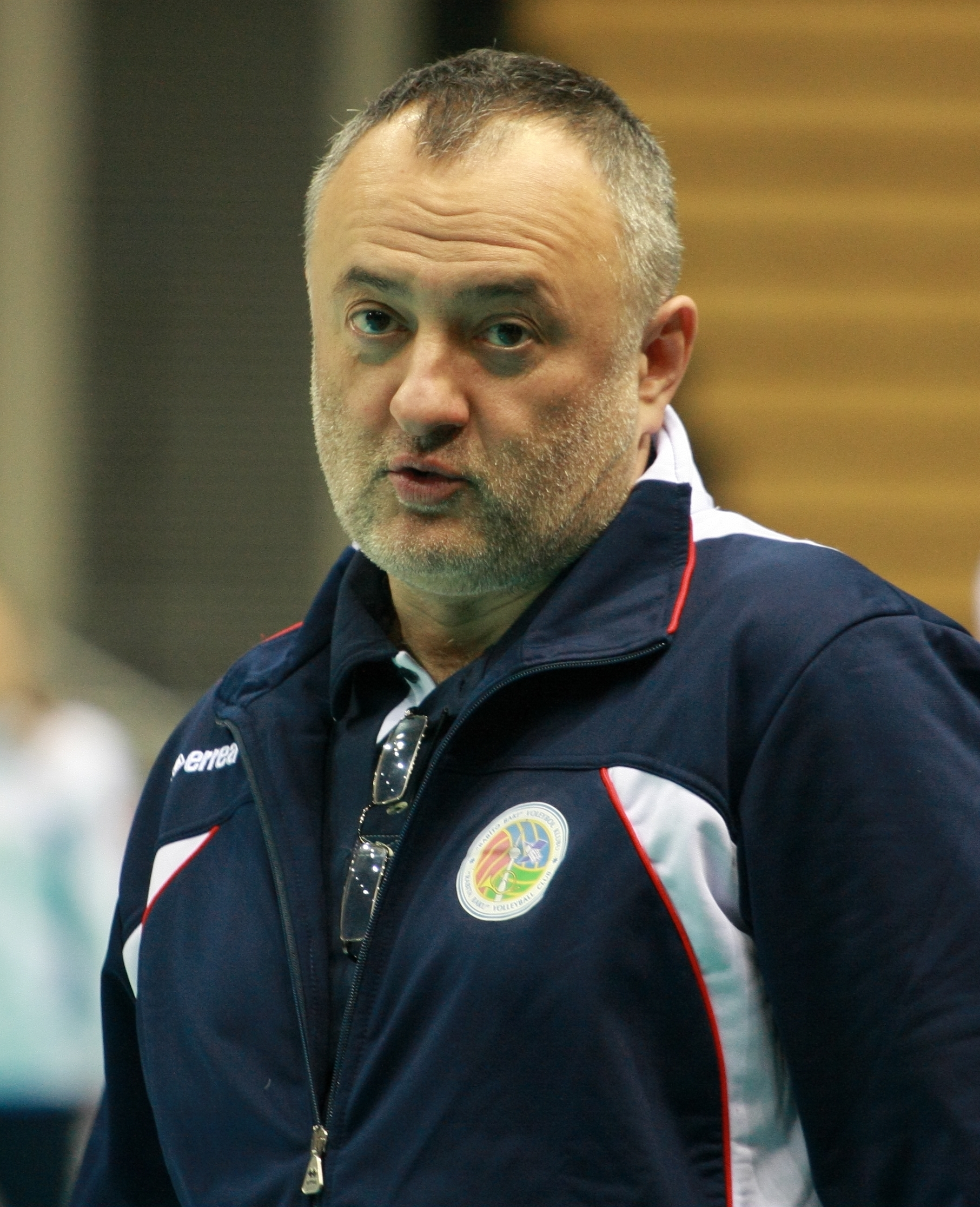
Zoran Gajić

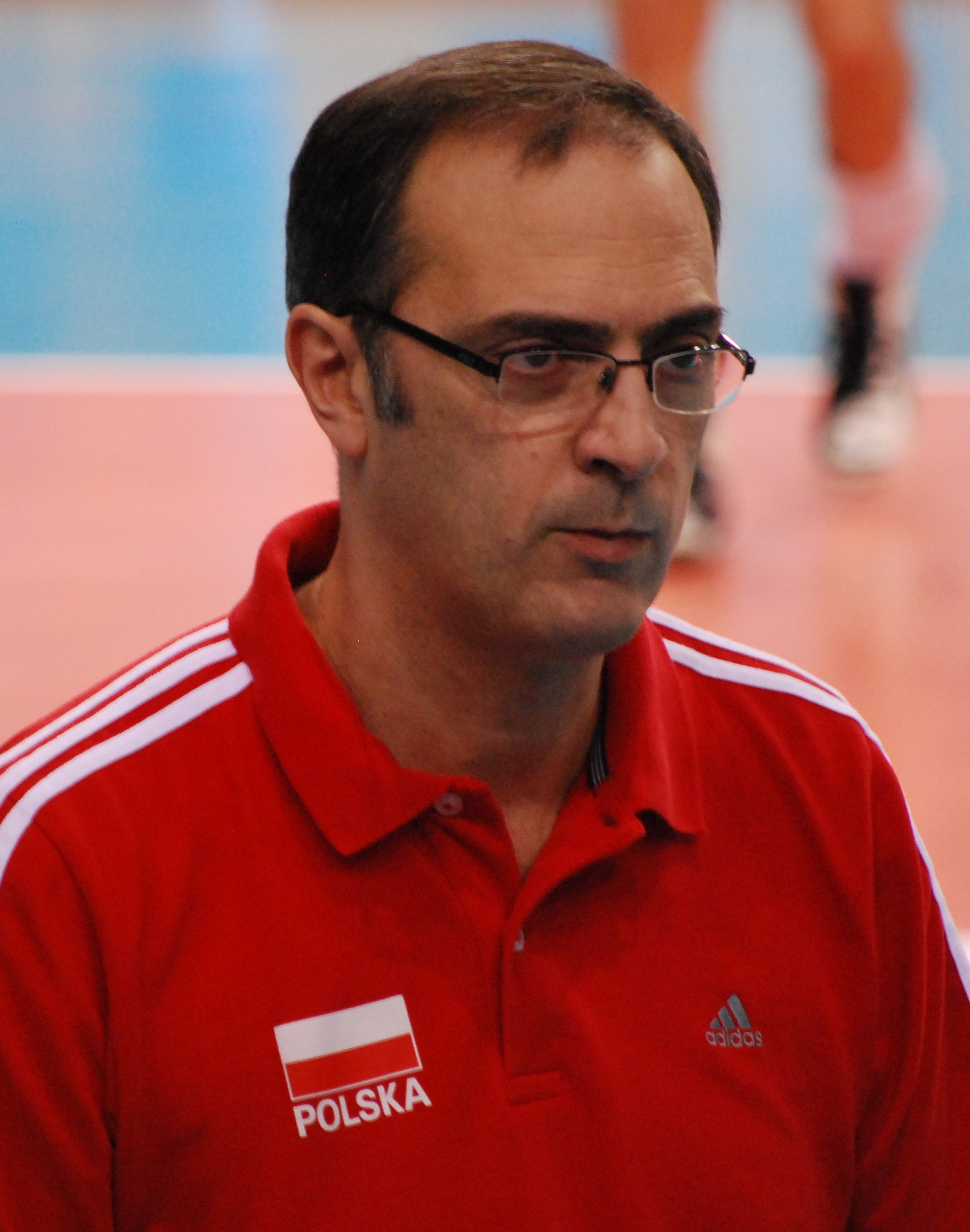
Daniel Castellani

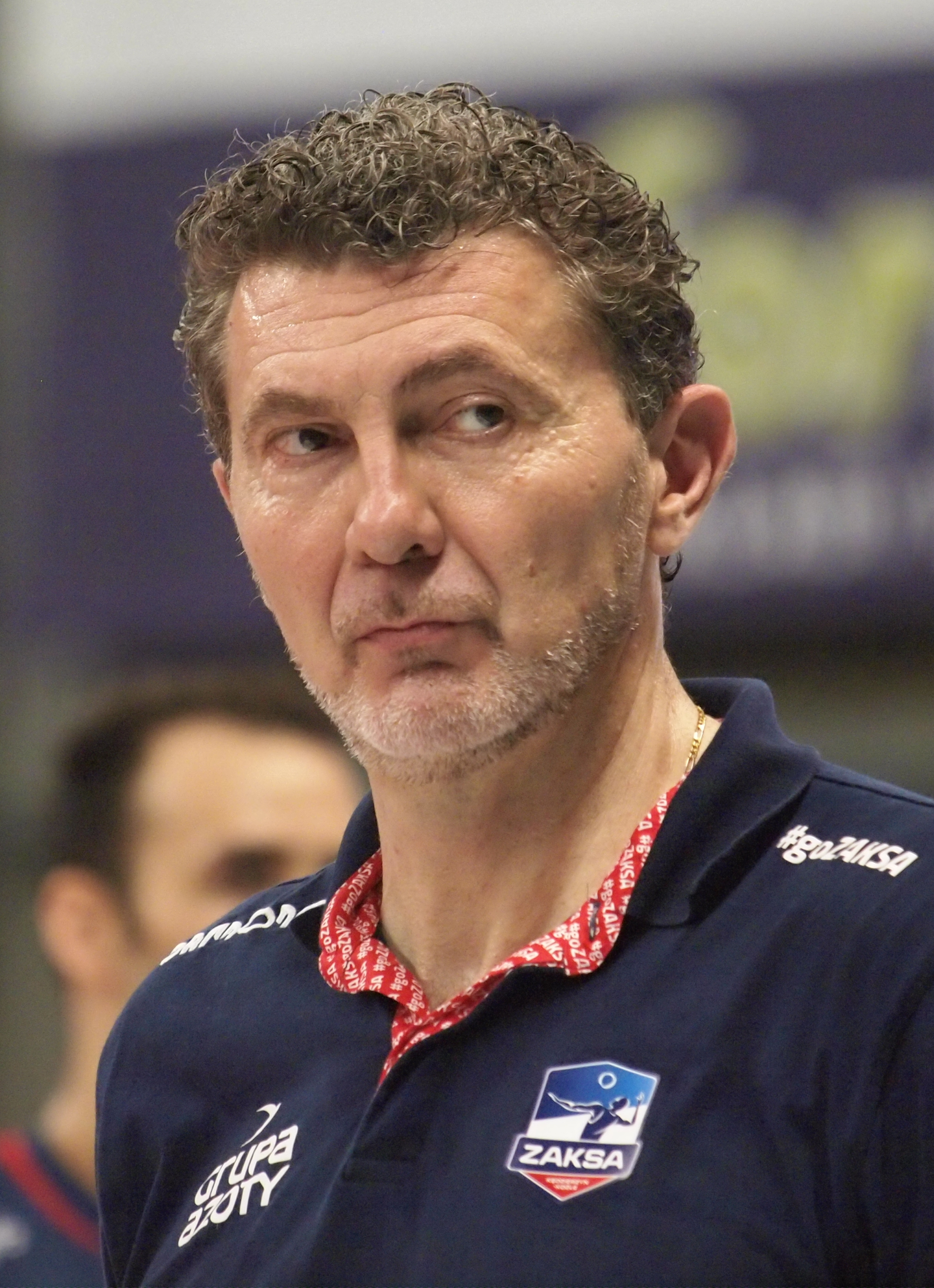
Andrea Gardini

- (Greece) Kostas Ampelas
- (Greece) Kyriakos Pantelias
- (Bulgaria) Dimitar Zahariev
- (Greece) Giannis Laios
- (Russia) Vladimir Kondra
- (Italy) Gian Paolo Montali
- (Serbia) Zoran Gajić
- (Italy) Daniele Ricci
- (Serbia) Ljubomir Travica
- (Argentina) Claudio Cuello
- (Sweden) Anders Kristiansson
- (Greece) Giannis Kalmazidis
- (Greece) Dimitris Kazazis
- (Italy) Roberto Piazza
- (Serbia) Slobodan Boškan
- (Spain) Fernando Muñoz Benitez
- (Italy) Alberto Giuliani
- (Argentina) Daniel Castellani
- (Italy) Andrea Gardini

== Season 2026–2027 squad ==
Shirt No	Nationality	Player	Birth Date	Height	Position
1	Bulgaria	Martin Atanasov	September 27, 1996 (age 30)	1.99	Οutside Hitter
2	Greece	Lampros Pitakoudis	July 13, 2002 (age 24)	2.02	Middle blocker
4	Cape Verde	Helder Spencer	October 6, 1992 (age 34)	2.00	Middle blocker
6	Greece	Mateo Hasbala	May 22, 2004 (age 22)	1.92	Setter
7	Greece	Frixos Kotsakis	May 1, 1999 (age 27)	1.94	Οutside Hitter
8	Greece	Petros Anagnostou	May 19, 2000 (age 26)	2.02	Middle blocker
11	Greece	Vangelis Vaiopoulos	March 11, 1997 (age 29)	2.01	Middle blocker
12	Greece	Nikos Zoupani	March 18, 1989 (age 37)	2.02	Opposite
15	Greece	Dimitris Tziavras	February 16, 1999 (age 27)	1.76	Libero
17	Italy	Michele Baranowicz (c)	August 5, 1989 (age 37)	1.97	Setter
18	Greece	Dimitris Constantinidis	August 5, 1993 (age 33)	1.88	Libero
19	Greece	Christos Perdikeas	November 15, 2009 (age 16)	1.94	Οutside Hitter
22	United States	Jake Hanes	May 3, 1998 (age 28)	2.12	Opposite
51	Greece	Alexandros Raptis	February 16, 2000 (age 26)	2.00	Οutside Hitter
66	Germany	Erik Röhrs	January 24, 2001 (age 25)	2.01	Οutside Hitter

=== Technical and managerial staff ===
Name	Job
(Italy) Alberto Giuliani	Head Coach
(Greece) Antonis Vourderis	Assistant Coach

=== Captains ===
- (Greece) Michalis Triantafyllidis (1989–1994)
- (Greece) Sakis Moustakidis (1994–1996)
- (Greece) Giorgos Dragovits (1996–2001)
- (Greece) Marios Giourdas (2001–2003)
- (Greece) Antonis Tsakiropoulos (2003–2007)
- (Greece) Vasilis Kournetas (2007–2009)
- (Greece) Dimitris Soultanopoulos (2009–2010)
- (Greece) Andreas Andreadis (2010–2012)
- (Greece) Kostas Christofidelis (2012–2015)
- (Greece) Menelaos Kokkinakis (2015–2017)
- (Greece) Kostas Christofidelis (2017–2019)
- (Greece) Giorgos Petreas (2019–2020)
- (Greece) Kostas Stivachtis (2020–2022)
- (Italy) Dragan Travica (2022–2025)
- (Serbia) Aleksandar Atanasijević (2025–2026)
- (Italy) Michele Baranowicz (2026–present)

== Historical performance in Volleyleague ==
=== Stats ===
Season	Position	W–L	Sets
1967–68	1st	6–0	18–0
1968–69	1st	13–1	40–12
1969–70	2nd	20–2	
1970–71	4th	16–6	
1971–72	2nd	22–2	
1972–73	2nd		
1973–74	1st	24–0	
1974–75	3rd		
1975–76	1st	14–1	
1976–77	2nd	13–2	
1977–78	1st	21–1	
1978–79	1st	22–0	
1979–80	1st	17–1	52–13
1980–81	1st	22–0	66–13
1981–82	2nd	20–2	63–11

Season	Position	W–L	Sets
1982–83	1st	21–1	65–16
1983–84	2nd	26–2	79–18
1984–85	2nd	25–3	80–14
1985–86	2nd	20–2	63–14
1986–87	1st	21–1	64–11
1987–88	1st	22–0	66–9
1988–89	1st	19–1	59–6
1989–90	1st	21–1	63–6
1990–91	1st	20–0	60–9
1991–92	1st	21–1	
1992–93	1st	20–1	62–12
1993–94	1st	21–1	65–11
1994–95	2nd		
1995–96	4th	18–8	61–36
1996–97	3rd	19–6	65–27

Season	Position	W–L	Sets
1997–98	1st	26–5	84–25
1998–99	1st	27–3	82–19
1999–00	1st	27–3	82–21
2000–01	1st	27–2	84–14
2001–02	2nd	25–6	83–30
2002–03	1st	25–2	78–24
2003–04	2nd	23–5	76–27
2004–05	2nd	20–11	72–37
2005–06	3rd	20–9	64–37
2006–07	3rd	22–6	72–31
2007–08	3rd	22–9	72–39
2008–09	1st	26–5	82–28
2009–10	1st	25–6	82–34
2010–11	1st	21–6	71–33
2011–12	5th	14–11	56–38

Season	Position	W–L	Sets
2012–13	1st	26–3	78–23
2013–14	1st	23–7	80–38
2014–15	2nd	22–7	75–40
2015–16	3rd	21–5	70–24
2016–17	2nd	28–4	89–24
2017–18	1st	30−0	90−12
2018–19	1st	27−3	79−24
2019–20	2nd	16−5	54−21
2020–21	1st	16−4	54−19
2021–22	2nd	18−6	50–26
2022–23	1st	22−3	70–23
2023–24	1st	20−5	63–28
2024–25	2nd	15−11	57–40
2025–26	4th	11−10	45–37

=== Positions ===
Position	1st	2nd	3rd	4th	5th
Times	32	17	6	3	1

== Kit manufacturer ==
The table below shows the history of kit providers for the Olympiacos team.

Period	Kit provider
2002–	Puma; Mikasa; Adidas

== See also ==
- Olympiacos Women's Volleyball Team
