= Igor Popov =

Ukrainian volleyball player (born 1970)

Personal information
- Nationality: Ukrainian
- Born: March 25, 1970 (age 56); Antratsyt, Ukraine
- Height: 2.03 m (6 ft 8 in)

Volleyball information
- Position: Outside hitter

Career
Years	Teams
1990–1994; 1994–1995; 1995–1997; 1997–1998; 1998–1999; 1999–2000	Shakhtar Lugansk; Ignis Padova; Com Cavi Napoli; Olympiacos; A.C. Orestiada; Kappa Torino

National team
Ukraine volleyball

Igor Popov (born 25 March 1970) is a Ukrainian retired volleyball player. He was a member of Ukraine men's national volleyball team. At club level, he played in Italy (for Ignis Padova, Com Cavi Napoli and Kappa Torino) and in Greece for Olympiacos and Orestiada.

Popov trained a women's volleyball team called "Favorit" (Kyiv, UA).
