= Ioannis Fakas =

Greek volleyball player and coach

Personal information
- Nationality: Greek
- Born: 16 March 1964 (age 62); Ioannina
- Height: 196 cm (6 ft 5 in)
- Weight: 85 kg (187 lb)

Volleyball information
- Position: Outside hitter

Career
| Years | Teams |
|---|---|
| 1983-1995 | (Greece) Olympiacos |

National team
| Greece |

Ioannis Fakas (Greek: Γιάννης Φάκας, born 16 March 1964) is a retired Greek volleyball player and the current assistant coach of the Greek powerhouse Olympiacos. He has made 109 appearances with the Greece men's national volleyball team. He played for Olympiacos for 12 years (1983–1995), winning 8 Greek Championships and 6 Greek Cups.

== Clubs ==
- (Greece) Olympiacos (1983–1995)
