= Achilleas Papadimitriou =

Greek volleyball player (born 1980)

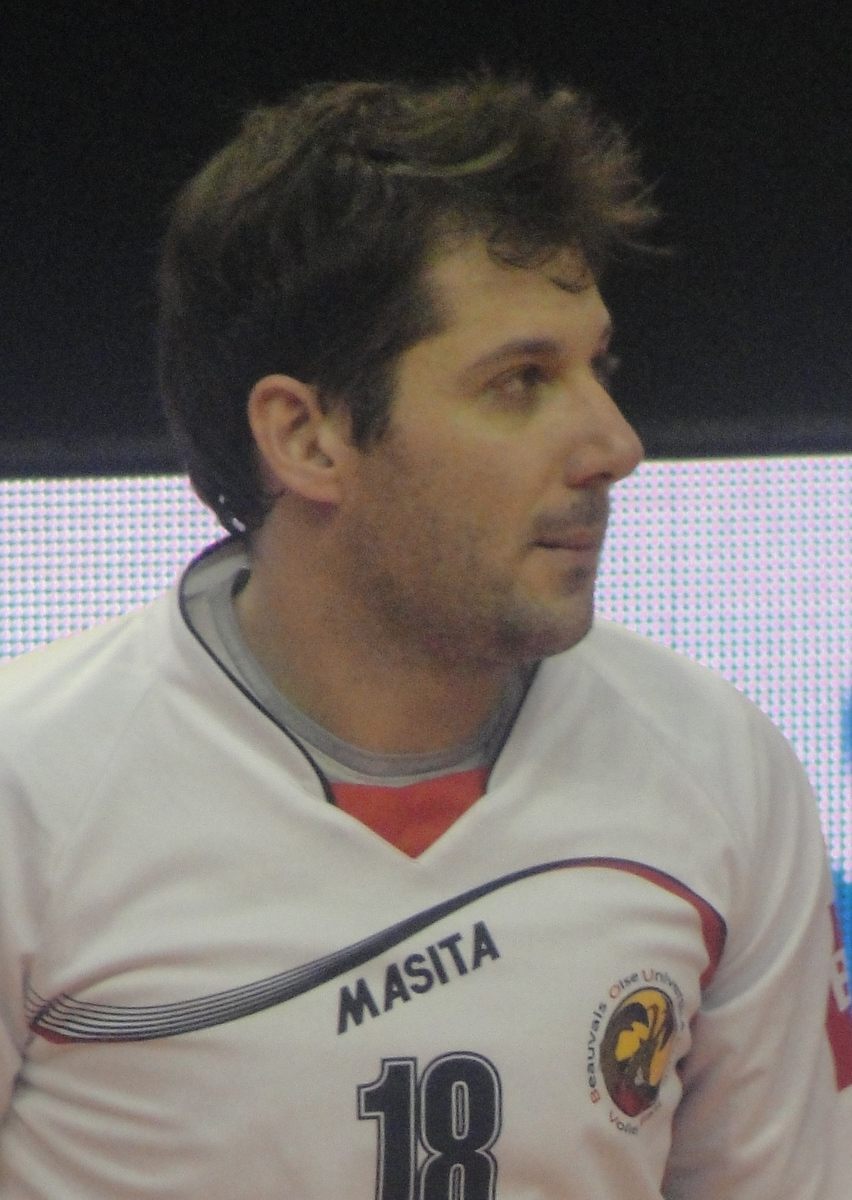

Personal information
- Nationality: Greek
- Born: 18 August 1980 (age 46)
- Height: 185 cm (6 ft 1 in)

Volleyball information

Career
- Years: Team
- 2007-2009 2009-2011: (Greece) Olympiacos S.C. (Greece) Panathinaikos VC

National team
- Years: Team
- –: Greece

Achilleas Papadimitriou (born 18 August 1980) is a former Greek volleyball player. He was part of the Greece men's national volleyball team. He competed at the 2009 Men's European Volleyball Championship. He played for the Olympiacos club between 2007 and 2009 and for the Panathinaikos club between 2009 and 2011.
