= Vasilis Xerovasilas =

Greek volleyball player

Personal information
- Nationality: Greek
- Born: 25 May 1963 (age 63) Kalamata
- Height: 194 cm (6 ft 4 in)

Volleyball information
- Position: Outside hitter

Career
- Years: Team
- 1974-1985 1985-1992: (Greece) Messiniakos (Greece) Olympiacos

National team
- Years: Team
- –: Greece

Vasilis Xerovasilas (Greek: Βασίλης Ξεροβάσιλας) (born 25 May 1963) is a retired Greek male volleyball player and volleyball coach. He has 34 appearances with Greece men's national volleyball team. He played for Olympiacos for 7 years (1985-1992), winning 6 Greek Championships.

== Clubs ==
- (Greece) Messiniakos (1974-1985)
- (Greece) Olympiacos (1985-1992)
