= 2023–24 Volleyleague (Greece) =

Volley League 2023–24
- League: Volley League
- Sport: Volleyball
- Duration: 28 October 2023 – 2 March 2024 (Regular season); 11 March – 22 April 2024 (Play-offs)
- Teams: 9
- TV partner: ERT3

Regular Season
- Season champions: Panathinaikos
- Season MVP: (Greece) Mitar Tzourits
- Top scorer: (Cuba) Fernardo Hernández 634 points

Finals
- Champions: Olympiacos 32th title

Volleyleague seasons
- 2022–23 2024–25

2023–24 Volleyleague is the 56th national championship and the 14th under the Volleyleague name. The league is organized by E.S.A.P. with 9 teams participating. The championship started on Saturday 28 October 2023.

== Teams ==
The teams participating were the top eight from the 2022–23 Volleyleague Greece and Kalamata 1980, which was promoted from Pre League. ΑΕΚ was denied promotion due to incurred debts. Initially a team from Pre League was going to receive a wild card, however it was decided not to award one

Location of 2023–24 Volleyleague Greece teams

Team	Seasons	Manager	Venue
Athlos Orestiada	2	Cristian Chitigoi	"Nikolaos Samaras" Orestiada Indoor Sports Hall
Kalamata 1980	1	Panagiotis Ntakouris	Tenta Sports Hall Kalamata
Kifissia	23	Konstantinos Christofidelis	Zirineio Indoor Hall
Milon	17	Thanasis Psarras	Kroisos Persis Indoor Hall
Olympiakos	56	Daniel Castellani	Dimotiko Gimnastirio Melina Merkouri
Panathinaikos	56	Dimitrios Andreopoulos	Agios Thomas Indoor Hall
PAOK	45	Joško Milenkoski	P.A.O.K. Sports Arena
Pegasus Polihnis	2	Giannis Orfanos	Alexandro Nikolaidis Indoor Hall
Foinikas Syros	15	Cedomir Ilić	Sports Center Dimitrios Vikelas

== Regular season ==
=== League table ===
Pos	Team	Pld	W	L	Pts	SW	SL	SR	SPW	SPL	SPR	Qualification or relegation
1	Panathinaikos	16	15	1	44	46	7	6.571	1327	1104	1.202	Championship play-offs
2	Olympiakos	16	14	2	41	42	16	2.625	1413	1238	1.141	Championship play-offs
3	Milon	16	11	5	34	35	19	1.842	1257	1165	1.079	Championship play-offs
4	PAOK	16	11	5	33	37	19	1.947	1321	1188	1.112	Championship play-offs
5	Kifissia	16	6	10	16	23	37	0.622	1284	1378	0.932	Positions 5–7 play-offs
6	Athlos Orestiadas	16	4	12	13	23	43	0.535	1386	1496	0.926	Positions 5–7 play-offs
7	Pegasus Polihnis	16	4	12	13	18	39	0.462	1182	1334	0.886	Positions 5–7 play-offs
8	AO Kalamata 1980	16	4	12	12	20	40	0.500	1273	1413	0.901	Relegation play-outs
9	Foinikas Syros	16	3	13	10	17	42	0.405	1255	1382	0.908	Relegation play-outs

Updated to match(es) played on 2 March 2024. Source: Standings 2023–24 Volleyleague

=== Results table ===
Home \ Away	ORE	KAL	KIF	MIL	OLY	PAO	POL	PAOK	SYR
Athlos Orestiadas		2–3	2–3	0–3	0–3	1–3	2–3	0–3	3–2
Kalamata	2–3		1–3	0–3	1–3	0–3	3–0	1–3	3–2
Kifissia	3–2	0–3		1–3	1–3	0–3	3–0	2–3	3–0
Milon	3–0	3–1	3–0		3–0	0–3	3–0	3–1	3–1
Olympiakos	3–1	3–0	3–1	3–2		3–1	3–1	3–0	3–0
Panathinaikos	3–0	3–0	3–0	3–0	3–1		3–0	3–0	3–0
Pegasus Polihnis	2–3	3–0	3–0	3–0	0–3	0–3		0–3	3–1
PAOK	3–1	3–0	3–0	3–0	1–3	2–3	3–0		3–0
Foinikas Syros	1–3	3–2	3–0	0–3	1–3	0–3	3–1	0–3	

Updated to match(es) played on 2 March 2024. Source: Volleyleague Results
Legend: Blue = home team win; Red = away team win.

== Championship playoffs ==
Teams that occupied the first 4 positions of the scoreboard entered a playoff round to determine the winner of Volleyleague 2023–24. Playoffs are determined in best-of-five series. The teams in positions 1 and 2 at the end of the Regular season have home advantage in the first game.

=== Semifinals ===
==== (1) Panathinaikos – (4) PAOK (3–1) ====
Date	Home team	Result	Away team	1st set	2nd set	3rd set	4th set	5th set	Total	Report
11 March	Panathinaikos	3–1	PAOK	23–25	25–19	31–29	25–23		104–96	
14 March	PAOK	1–3	Panathinaikos	21–25	25–19	18–25	21–25		85–94	
18 March	Panathinaikos	1–3	PAOK	16–25	21–25	25–20	18–25		80–95	
21 March	PAOK	1–3	Panathinaikos	21–25	23–25	25–18	19–25		88–93	

==== (2) Olympiacos– (3) Milon (3–2) ====
Date	Home team	Result	Away team	1st set	2nd set	3rd set	4th set	5th set	Total	Report
11 March	Olympiacos	3–0	Milon	25–22	25–22	25–21			75–65	
14 March	Milon	3–0	Olympiacos	25–23	25–21	25–21			75–65	
18 March	Olympiacos	3–1	Milon	25–18	25–19	20–25	25–17		95–79	
21 March	Milon	3–0	Olympiacos	25–22	25–23	25–21			75–66	
25 March	Olympiacos	3–0	Milon	25–18	25–18	25–19			75–55	

=== Finals ===
==== (1) Panathinaikos – (2) Olympiacos (1–3) ====
Date	Home team	Result	Away team	1st set	2nd set	3rd set	4th set	5th set	Total	Report
11 April	Panathinaikos	0–3	Olympiacos	23–25	30–32	17–25			70–82	
15 April	Olympiacos	3–0	Panathinaikos	25–17	25–16	26–24			76–57	
18 April	Panathinaikos	3–2	Olympiacos	25–15	21–25	20–25	25–20	19–17	110–102	
22 April	Olympiacos	3–2	Panathinaikos	25–17	25–19	20–25	21–25	15–12	106–98	

== Playoffs positions 5–7 ==
Playoff to determine positions 5 to 7 will be held in round robin format, with each team playing two matches against the other two. Teams are carrying points from regular season. Winner of positions 5–7 playoffs qualifies for 2024–25 CEV Cup. Second placed team qualifies for Volleyball Balkan cup.

=== Table ===
Pos	Team	Pld	W	L	Pts	SW	SL	SR	SPW	SPL	SPR	Qualification or relegation
1	Kifissia	4	2	2	22	7	7	1.000	315	323	0.975	2024–25 CEV Cup
2	Pegasus Polihnis	4	3	1	21	9	7	1.286	382	360	1.061	Volleyball Balkan cup
3	Athlos Orestiadas	4	1	3	17	7	9	0.778	353	367	0.962	

Updated to match(es) played on 13 April 2024. Source: Volleyleague

=== Results table ===
Home \ Away	KIF	ORE	POL
Kifissia		3–1	3–0
Athlos Orestiadas	3–0		2–3
Pegasus Polihnis	3–1	3–1	

Updated to match(es) played on 13 April 2024. Source: Volleyleague Results
Legend: Blue = home team win; Red = away team win.

== Play outs ==
The 2 teams that occupied the last 2 positions of the scoreboard played a play-off to stay in the Volleyleague. It was a best-of-five series.

=== (8) Kalamata '80 – (9) Foinikas Syros (0–3) ===
Date	Home team	Result	Away team	1st set	2nd set	3rd set	4th set	5th set	Total	Report
10 March	Kalamata '80	2–3	Foinikas Syros	18–25	19–25	25–23	25–19	5–15	92–107	
16 March	Foinikas Syros	3–1	Kalamata '80	25–16	19–25	25–17	25–23		94–81	
24 March	Kalamata '80	1–3	Foinikas Syros	21–25	25–23	26–28	23–25		95–101	

Kalamata '80 was relegated to Pre League.
