= Nikolay Jeliazkov =

Bulgarian volleyball player (born 1970)

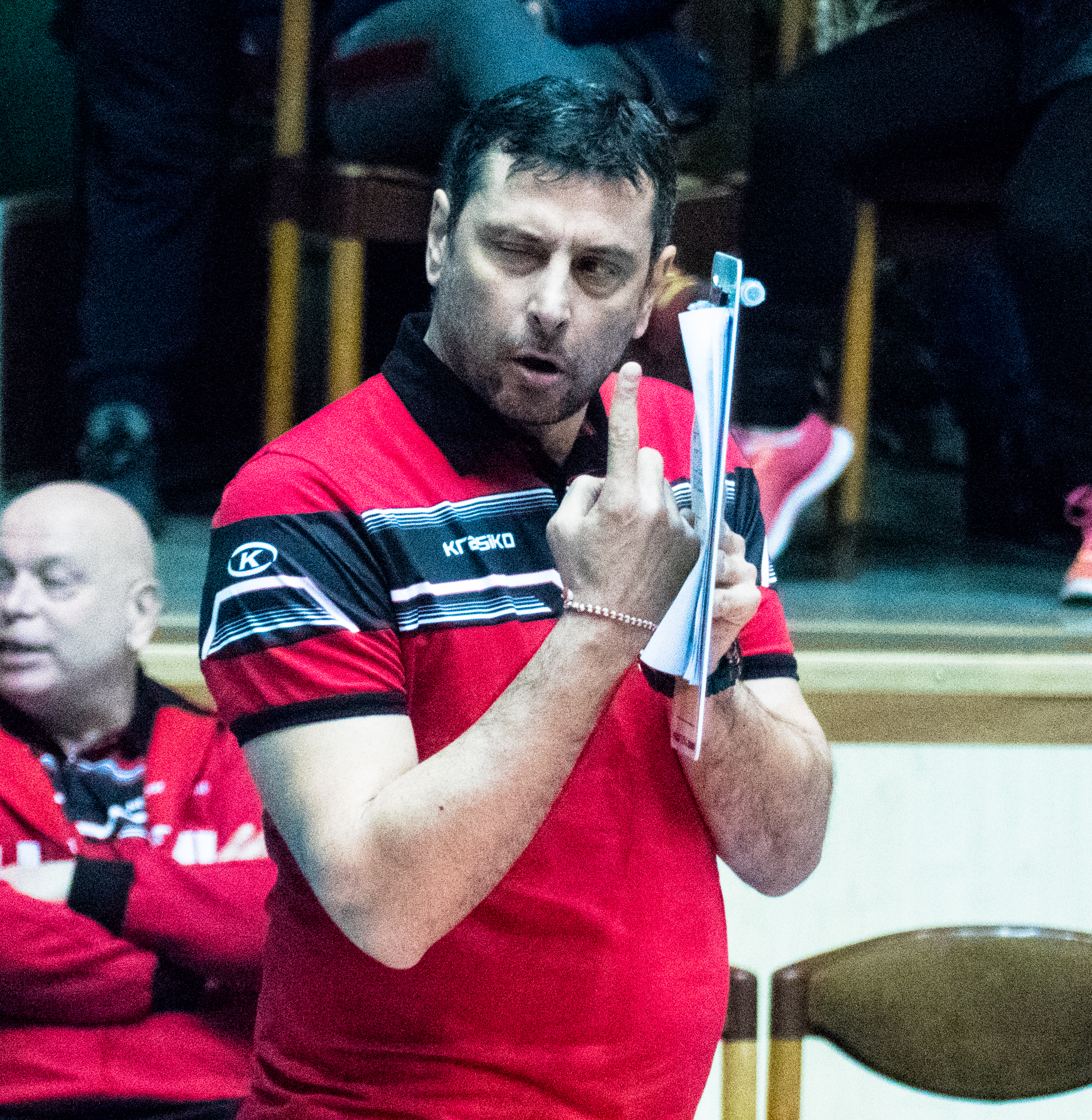

Personal information
- Nationality: Bulgarian
- Born: 26 February 1970 (age 56)
- Height: 198 cm (6 ft 6 in)

Coaching information
Previous teams coached
Years	Teams
2010–2011; 2013; 2013; 2014; 2014–2015; 2015; 2017–2018; 2019–2022; 2022–2023; 2022–	Levski Volley (coach) (Russia) Yaroslavich (North Macedonia) Macedonia; Bulgaria (U21); Neftochimic Burgas; Bulgaria (interim) (Romania) CS Arcada Galați; Neftochimic Burgas; Bulgaria; Levski Volley

Career
Years	Teams
1990–1993; 1993–1994; 1994–1995; 1995–1997; 1998–2001; 2001–2002; 2002–2003; 2003–2004; 2004–2005	(Bulgaria) CSKA Sofia (Italy) Fochi Zinella Bologna (Brazil) Olympikus/Telesp (Greece) Orestiada (Greece) Olympiacos (Greece) PAOK Thessaloniki (Greece) A.E. Nikaia (Greece) Iraklis Thessaloniki (Italy) Carife Ferrara

National team
Bulgaria

Nikolay Jeliazkov or Zheliazkov (Bulgarian: Николай Желязков) (born 26 February 1970) is a former Bulgarian male volleyball player and coach. He was part of the Bulgaria men's national volleyball team at the 1994 FIVB Volleyball Men's World Championship and 1996 Summer Olympics. After his retirement he became a volleyball coach. He was coach of Bulgaria men's national volleyball team at the 2015 European Games in Baku, Azerbaijan.

== Clubs ==
- CSKA Sofia
- Olympikus/Telesp
- Olympiacos Piraeus
