= Andreas Theodoridis =

Greek volleyball player (born 1968)

Personal information
- Nationality: Greek
- Born: 23 March 1968 (age 58); Kavala
- Height: 203 cm (6 ft 8 in)

National team
Greece

Andreas Theodoridis (born 23 March 1968) is a former Greek male volleyball player. He was part of the Greece men's national volleyball team. He competed with the national team at the 1994 FIVB Volleyball Men's World Championship in Athens. He played for Olympiacos for the biggest part of his career, winning the 1996 CEV Cup Winners' Cup, numerous domestic titles and major European honours with the club.

== Clubs ==
- (Greece) Olympiacos
- (Greece) Panellinios
