= Stefanos Polyzos (volleyball player) =

Greek volleyball player and coach

Personal information
- Nationality: Greek
- Born: 15 July 1953 (age 73); Karditsa
- Height: 188 cm (6 ft 2 in)

Volleyball information
- Position: Outside hitter

Career
Years	Teams
1968-1973; 1973-1988	(Greece) Ionikos Nikaias (Greece) Olympiaco Piraeus

National team
Greece

Stefanos Polyzos (Greek: Στέφανος Πολύζος) (born 15 July 1953) is a retired Greek male volleyball player and volleyball coach. He has 254 appearances with Greece men's national volleyball team. He played for Olympiacos for 15 years (1973-1988), winning numerous titles. He was also the coach of Olympiacos Women's Volleyball Team in 2007.

== Clubs ==
- (Greece) Olympiacos (1973-1988)
