= Theologos Daridis =

Greek volleyball player (born 1991)

Personal information
- Nationality: Greek
- Born: 18 July 1991 (age 35) Orestiada, Greece
- Height: 180 cm (5 ft 11 in)

Volleyball information
- Position: Libero
- Current club: Olympiacos

Career
- Years: Team
- 2001–2006 2006–2010 2010–2011 2011–2012 2012–2013 2013–2016 2016–2017 2017–: A.C. Orestiada; Foinikas Syrou; Milonas; Panathinaikos; Milonas; Ethnikos Alexandroupolis; Panathinaikos; Olympiacos

National team
- Years: Team
- –: Greece

Theologos Daridis (born 18 July 1991) is a Greek male volleyball player. He has been a member of the Greece men's national volleyball team. At club level he currently plays for Olympiacos.
