= Antonios Tsakiropoulos =

Greek volleyball player (born 1969)

Personal information
- Nationality: Greek
- Born: 1 July 1969 (age 57); Dikaia, Evros, Greece
- Height: 2.05 m (6 ft 9 in)
- Weight: 93 kg (205 lb)
- Spike: 350 cm (140 in)
- Block: 336 cm (132 in)

Career
Years	Teams
1987–1995; 1995–2007; 2007–2009; 2009–2010	(Greece) Orestiada (Greece) Olympiacos (Greece) Achilleas Lamia (Greece) Kifissia

National team
Greece (393)

Antonios Tsakiropoulos (born 1 July 1969) is a former Greek male volleyball player. He was part of the Greece men's national volleyball team. He competed with the national team at the 2004 Summer Olympics in Athens, Greece. He played for Olympiacos from 1995 to 2007.

== See also ==
- Greece at the 2004 Summer Olympics
