= Sotirios Tsergas =

Greek volleyball player (born 1978)

Personal information
- Nationality: Greek
- Born: 3 July 1978 (age 48)
- Height: 192 cm (6 ft 4 in)
- Weight: 84 kg (185 lb)
- Spike: 336 cm (132 in)
- Block: 320 cm (126 in)

Career
| Years | Teams |
|---|---|
| 2004-2007; 2007-2009 | (Greece) Panellinios (Greece) Olympiacos S.C. |

National team
| Greece |

Sotirios Tsergas (born 3 July 1978) is a Greek male volleyball player. He was part of the Greece men's national volleyball team. On club level he played for Olympiacos and Panellinios.
