= Dimitar Zahariev =

Bulgarian volleyball player and coach (1928–2022)

Personal information
- Nationality: Bulgarian
- Born: 21 October 1928
- Died: 3 January 2022 (aged 93)

Coaching information
Previous teams coached
Years	Teams
1964; 1980–1984	Bulgaria (Greece) Olympiacos

Career
Teams
	(Bulgaria) VK Slavia Sofia

National team
Bulgaria

Dimitar Zahariev (Bulgarian: Димитър Захариев) (21 October 1928 – 3 January 2022) was a Bulgarian volleyball player and volleyball coach. He was the head coach of the Bulgaria men's national volleyball team that won the 5th place in the 1964 Olympic Games in Tokyo, in the team's first ever participation in the Olympic games. At club level, he was head coach of the Greek powerhouse Olympiacos from 1980 to 1984 and coached the club to 2 Greek Championships (1981, 1983) and 2 Greek Cups (1981, 1983). He also led Olympiacos to their first ever CEV Champions League Final Four participation in 1981-1982 season (4th place), which was the first ever CEV Champions League Final Four participation by any Greek volleyball club. Zahariev died on 3 January 2022, at the age of 93.
