= Iraklis Doriadis =

Greek volleyball player and coach

Personal information
- Nationality: Greek
- Born: 15 May 1954 (age 72); Constantinople
- Height: 193 cm (6 ft 4 in)
- Weight: 93 kg (205 lb)

Volleyball information
- Position: Middle Blocker

Career
| Years | Teams |
|---|---|
| 1977-1986 | (Greece) Olympiacos |

National team
| Greece |

Iraklis Doriadis (Greek: Ηρακλής Δωριάδης, born 15 May 1954) is a retired Greek volleyball player and volleyball coach. He has 292 appearances with Greece men's national volleyball team. He played for Olympiacos for 9 years (1977–1986), winning numerous titles. He was also the coach of Olympiacos Women's Volleyball Team.

== Clubs ==
- (Greece) Olympiacos (1977–1986)
