= Kaloudis Alexoudis =

Greek volleyball player (born 1961)

Personal information
- Nationality: Greek
- Born: 24 February 1961 (age 65); Soufli
- Height: 184 cm (6 ft 0 in)

Volleyball information
- Position: Outside hitter

Career
Years	Teams
1975–1979; 1980–1985	(Greece) Evros Soufliou (Greece) Olympiacos

National team
Greece

Kaloudis Alexoudis (Greek: Καλούδης Αλεξούδης, born 24 February 1961) is a retired Greek male volleyball player. He was a part of Greece men's national volleyball team. He played for Olympiacos for 5 years (1980–1985), winning 2 Greek Championships and 2 Greek Cups.

== Clubs ==
- (Greece) Evros Soufliou (1975–1979)
- (Greece) Olympiacos (1980–1985)
