= Michalis Triantafyllidis =

Greek volleyball player

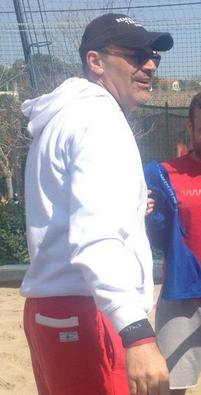

Personal information
- Nationality: Greek
- Born: 29 June 1962 (age 64); Drapetsona, Piraeus
- Height: 194 cm (6 ft 4 in)
- Weight: 90 kg (198 lb)
- Spike: 345 cm (136 in)
- Block: 335 cm (132 in)

Volleyball information
- Position: Outside hitter
- Number: 12

Career
Years	Teams
1980–1994; 1994–1998	(Greece) Olympiacos (Greece) Panathinaikos

National team
Greece
Honours
Men's volleyball
Representing Greece
European Championship
Bronze medal – third place	1987 Ghent	Team competition

Michalis Triantafyllidis (Greek: Μιχάλης Τριανταφυλλίδης, born 29 June 1962) is a retired Greek male volleyball player. He has 365 appearances with Greece men's national volleyball team and he was part of the Greek team winning the bronze medal at the 1987 European Championship in Belgium. He played for Greek Olympiacos for 14 years (1980-1994).

== Clubs ==
- (Greece) Olympiacos (1980-1994)
- (Greece) Panathinaikos (1994-1998)
