= Giannis Laios =

Greek volleyball player

Personal information
- Nationality: Greek
- Born: 17 March 1951 (age 75); Athens
- Height: 189 cm (6 ft 2 in)
- Weight: 90 kg (198 lb)

Volleyball information
- Position: Setter

Career
Years	Teams
1973-1985	(Greece) Olympiacos (Greece) Panathinaikos

National team
Greece

Giannis Laios (Greek: Γιάννης Λάιος, born 17 March 1951) is a retired Greek male volleyball player and volleyball coach. He has 217 appearances with Greece men's national volleyball team. He played for Olympiacos for 12 years (1973-1985), winning 7 Greek Championships and 2 Greek Cups. After his retirement, he became head coach of Olympiacos for seven seasons (winter 1987-1992, 1995-1996) and coached the club to 6 Greek Championships, 3 Greek Cups and most importantly the 1995–96 CEV Cup Winners Cup.

== Clubs ==
- (Greece) Olympiacos (1973-1985)
- (Greece) Panathinaikos (1985-1986)
