= Christos Dimitrakopoulos =

Greek volleyball player (born 1974)

Personal information
- Nationality: Greek
- Born: 1 July 1974 (age 52); Kalamata, Greece
- Height: 188 cm (6 ft 2 in)
- Weight: 86 kg (190 lb)
- Spike: 325 cm (128 in)
- Block: 325 cm (128 in)

Career
Years	Teams
2001-2003; 2003-2005	Panathinaikos; Olympiacos

National team
Greece

Christos Dimitrakopoulos (born 1 July 1974) is a retired Greek volleyball player. He was part of the Greece men's national volleyball team at the 2002 FIVB Volleyball Men's World Championship in Argentina. He played for Olympiacos and Panathinaikos.

== Clubs ==
- Panathinaikos (2001-2003)
- Olympiacos (2003–2005)
