= Dimitrios Kazazis =

Greek volleyball player and coach

Personal information
- Nationality: Greek
- Born: 24 October 1966 (age 60); Thessaloniki, Greece
- Height: 194 cm (6 ft 4 in)
- Weight: 95 kg (209 lb)

Coaching information
Previous teams coached
Years	Teams
2004–2008; 2009–2010; 2011–2012; 2012–2015; 2016–2017; 2020–2022; 2022–2023	AEK; Greece; Panathinaikos; Olympiacos; Panathinaikos (women); Olympiacos; Foinikas Syros

Volleyball information
- Position: Setter

Career
Years	Teams
1981–1985; 1985–1994; 1994–1996; 1996–1997; 1997–2002	Dimokritos; Olympiacos; Ktisifon; Filia Ilioupolis; Panellinios

National team
1986–2001	Greece (67)
Honours
Men's volleyball
Representing Greece
European Championship
Bronze medal – third place	1987 Ghent	Team competition

Dimitrios Kazazis (Greek: Δημήτριος Καζάζης, born 24 October 1966) is a retired Greek male volleyball player and current coach. He has 67 appearances with Greece men's national volleyball team and he was part of the Greek team winning the bronze medal at the 1987 European Championship in Belgium. He played for Greek powerhouse Olympiacos for 9 years (1985–1994), winning 8 Greek Championships and 5 Greek Cups. From 2012 to 2015, he was head coach of Olympiacos and coached the club to 2 Greek Championships (2013, 2014), 2 Greek Cups (2013, 2014) and 2 Greek League Cups (2013, 2015).

== Clubs ==
- (Greece) Olympiacos (1985–1994)
