= Theodoros Chatziantoniou =

Greek volleyball player (born 1974)

Personal information
- Nationality: Greek
- Born: 16 March 1974 (age 52) Thessaloniki
- Height: 2.04 m (6 ft 8 in)
- Weight: 95 kg (209 lb)
- Spike: 360 cm (140 in)
- Block: 350 cm (140 in)

Volleyball information
- Current club: Aris (coach)

Career
- Years: Team
- 1993–1998 2004–2008 2008–2010: (Greece) Panathinaikos (Greece) Olympiacos (Greece) Panathinaikos

National team
- Years: Team
- –: Greece (401 caps)

Theodoros "Akis" Chatziantoniou (born 16 March 1974) is a former Greek volleyball player. He was part of the Greece men's national volleyball team. He competed with the national team at the 2004 Summer Olympics in Athens, Greece.

== Clubs ==
- (Greece) Panathinaikos (1993–1998)
- (Greece) Olympiacos (2004-2008)
- (Greece) Panathinaikos (2008-2010)

== See also ==
- Greece at the 2004 Summer Olympics
