= Leszek Urbanowicz =

Polish volleyball player (born 1964)

Personal information
- Nationality: Polish
- Born: 1 June 1964 (age 60); Gdańsk, Poland

Sport
- Sport: Volleyball

Leszek Urbanowicz (born 1 June 1964) is a Polish volleyball player. He competed in the men's tournament at the 1996 Summer Olympics.
