= Georgios Lykoudis =

Greek volleyball player and coach

Personal information
- Nationality: Greek
- Born: 4 February 1964 (age 62); Thessaloniki
- Height: 191 cm (6 ft 3 in)
- Weight: 100 kg (220 lb)

Volleyball information
- Position: Middle Blocker

Career
| Years | Teams |
|---|---|
| 1988-1996 | (Greece) Olympiacos |

National team
| Greece |

Georgios Lykoudis (Greek: Γιώργος Λυκούδης, born 4 February 1964) is a retired Greek male volleyball player and volleyball coach currently coaching Panachaiki. He has 154 appearances with Greece men's national volleyball team. He played for Olympiacos for 6 years (1988-1996), winning 6 consecutive Greek Championships, 4 Greek Cups and the 1995–96 CEV Cup Winners Cup. In 1993 (while still an active player) he became head coach of Olympiacos Women's Volleyball Team and coached the team for 3 years. In 2002 he became assistant coach of Olympiacos. In 2006-07 he was appointed head coach Olympiacos Women's Volleyball Team for the second time and in 2009 he became head coach of Greece women's national volleyball team.

== Clubs ==
- (Greece) Olympiacos (1988-1996)
