= Neoklis Kazazis =

Greek lawyer, university professor and writer

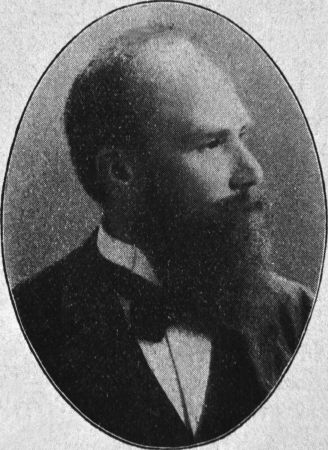
- Born: 1849; Petra, Lesvos, Ottoman Empire
- Died: 1936 (aged 86–87)
- Occupations: Lawyer, university professor, writer

Neoklis G. Kazazis (Greek: Νεοκλής Καζάζης, c. 1849–1936) was a Greek lawyer, university professor and writer. He was the president of the company "Ellinismos" (Greek: "Ο Ελληνισμός») for decades.

== Biography ==
Kazazis was born in 1849 in Petra, Lesvos, Ottoman Empire. He studied at the Law School of Athens and in 1870 he obtained his doctorate. Then he went for further studies in France and Germany. After completing his studies he returned to Greece in 1877. Two years later he became assistant professor of Philosophy of Law at the Law School. In 1882 he was appointed head of department of Public Finance and Statistics of the Ministry of Finance, a position he held until 1887 when was appointed General Director of Post Offices and Telegraphs until 1890. At the same time he continued his academic career until 1910. He was three times dean of the Law School (1890–1891, 1900–1901 and 1907–1908) and Rector of the University of Athens during the academic year 1902–1903. As a rector, in 1903, he organized an informative campaign throughout Europe in favor of the Greek national stance and politics. In 1902 during his visit to Plovdiv there was an assassination attempt against his life.

In 1910 he resigned in order to pursue political career. At the election on August 8, 1910 he was elected member of the Parliament as a representative of Attica-Boeotia (managing to come second in popular vote in Athens). However, in the election that followed in November of the same year he couldn’t be re-elected.

He was awarded with the Holy Cross of the Knights of the Holy Sepulchre by the Patriarchate of Jerusalem, because of his participation on the committee for collecting financial contributions in favor of the Holy Sepulchre. In May 1909 he was admitted to the Masonic Lodge "Athena". He died in 1936.

== At "Ellinismos" company ==
On the 10 October 1894, Neoklis Kazazis was elected president of the company "Ellinismos" (Greek: "Ο Ελληνισμός"), succeeding Georgios Kremos, position he kept until his death. As president he contributed a lot and as a result the company developed and prospered greatly during those years. He organized many campaigns and he founded branches in Greece and abroad. Moreover, he organized rallies in support of national issues; he was a prolific writer and he developed relations with many foreign philhellenes intellectuals. His activities were characterized as an effort to boost national morale, to maintain the tradition, to promote the past as a glorious example, to achieve the political and cultural renaissance of Greece and to fulfil the "Megali Idea", a goal of establishing a Greek state that would encompass all ethnic Greek-inhabited areas.

== Political views ==
Kazazis through his writing and works promoted the ideology of "Megali Idea". At the same time through his editorials in newspapers he expressed his anti-parliamentarism. In 1915 he clashed with the Venizelist political party because of his opposition to Eleftherios Venizelos, due to the attitude of the latter towards the monarchy, which impacted the company as it suspended operations until 1923. After 1923, Kazazis opposed Communism considering that the ideology and the various reports of Balkan Federation jeopardized the national achievements of the previous years.
