= 2001–02 CEV Champions League =

- League: CEV Champions League
- Sport: Volleyball
- Duration: 4 December 2001 – 24 March 2002
- Number of teams: 16

Finals
- Venue: (Poland) Opole
- Champions: (Italy) Lube Banca Macerata

CEV Champions League seasons
- ← 2000–01 2002–03 →

The 2001–02 CEV Champions League was the 43rd edition of the highest level European volleyball club competition organised by the European Volleyball Confederation.

== League round ==
=== Pool A ===
| Pos | Team | Pld | W | L | Pts | SW | SL | SR | SPW | SPL | SPR | Qualification |
|---|---|---|---|---|---|---|---|---|---|---|---|---|
| 1 | (Greece) Iraklis Thessaloniki | 6 | 4 | 2 | 10 | 16 | 8 | 2.000 | 568 | 509 | 1.116 | 4th Finals |
| 2 | (Belgium) Noliko Maaseik | 6 | 4 | 2 | 10 | 14 | 11 | 1.273 | 557 | 540 | 1.031 | 4th Finals |
| 3 | (France) Paris Volley | 6 | 2 | 4 | 8 | 11 | 15 | 0.733 | 569 | 571 | 0.996 | |
| 4 | (Russia) Izumrud Ekaterinburg | 6 | 2 | 4 | 8 | 9 | 16 | 0.563 | 493 | 567 | 0.869 | |

=== Pool B ===
| Pos | Team | Pld | W | L | Pts | SW | SL | SR | SPW | SPL | SPR | Qualification |
|---|---|---|---|---|---|---|---|---|---|---|---|---|
| 1 | (Poland) Mostostal Azoty Kędzierzyn-Koźle | 6 | 5 | 1 | 11 | 15 | 9 | 1.667 | 535 | 504 | 1.062 | 4th Finals |
| 2 | (Greece) Olympiacos Piraeus | 6 | 4 | 2 | 10 | 14 | 9 | 1.556 | 541 | 496 | 1.091 | 4th Finals |
| 3 | (Bulgaria) Levski Siconco Sofia | 6 | 2 | 4 | 8 | 11 | 15 | 0.733 | 540 | 590 | 0.915 | |
| 4 | (Austria) Hotvolleys Vienna | 6 | 1 | 5 | 7 | 9 | 16 | 0.563 | 539 | 565 | 0.954 | |

=== Pool C ===
| Pos | Team | Pld | W | L | Pts | SW | SL | SR | SPW | SPL | SPR | Qualification |
|---|---|---|---|---|---|---|---|---|---|---|---|---|
| 1 | (Italy) Lube Banca Macerata | 6 | 5 | 1 | 11 | 16 | 7 | 2.286 | 546 | 474 | 1.152 | 4th Finals |
| 2 | (Germany) VfB Friedrichshafen | 6 | 4 | 2 | 10 | 14 | 11 | 1.273 | 595 | 569 | 1.046 | 4th Finals |
| 3 | (Spain) Unicaja Almería | 6 | 3 | 3 | 9 | 12 | 11 | 1.091 | 515 | 522 | 0.987 | |
| 4 | (Turkey) Arçelik İstanbul | 6 | 0 | 6 | 6 | 5 | 18 | 0.278 | 462 | 553 | 0.835 | |

=== Pool D ===
| Pos | Team | Pld | W | L | Pts | SW | SL | SR | SPW | SPL | SPR | Qualification |
|---|---|---|---|---|---|---|---|---|---|---|---|---|
| 1 | (Russia) Luzhniki Moscow | 6 | 5 | 1 | 11 | 15 | 6 | 2.500 | 541 | 485 | 1.115 | 4th Finals |
| 2 | (France) Tours VB | 6 | 4 | 2 | 10 | 14 | 7 | 2.000 | 512 | 467 | 1.096 | 4th Finals |
| 3 | (Italy) Sisley Treviso | 6 | 3 | 3 | 9 | 12 | 10 | 1.200 | 534 | 500 | 1.068 | |
| 4 | (Turkey) İstanbul BBSK | 6 | 0 | 6 | 6 | 0 | 18 | 0.000 | 327 | 462 | 0.708 | |

== 4th Finals ==
| Team 1 | Agg. | Team 2 | 1st leg | 2nd leg | Setpoints |
|---|---|---|---|---|---|
| VfB Friedrichshafen (Germany) | 4–4 | (Poland) Mostostal Azoty KK | 3–1 | 1–3 | 191–198 |
| Luzhniki Moscow (Russia) | 3–5 | (Greece) Olympiacos Piraeus | 0–3 | 3–2 | |
| Lube Banca Macerata (Italy) | 5–3 | (Belgium) Noliko Maaseik | 2–3 | 3–0 | |
| Iraklis Thessaloniki (Greece) | 6–0 | (France) Tours VB | 3–0 | 3–0 | |

=== First leg ===
| Date | Time | | Score | | Set 1 | Set 2 | Set 3 | Set 4 | Set 5 | Total |
|---|---|---|---|---|---|---|---|---|---|---|
| 14 Feb | 19:00 | VfB Friedrichshafen (Germany) | 3–1 | (Poland) Mostostal Azoty KK | 30–32 | 25–23 | 28–26 | 25–22 | | 108–103 |
| 13 Feb | 19:00 | Luzhniki Moscow (Russia) | 0–3 | (Greece) Olympiacos Piraeus | 23–25 | 23–25 | 24–26 | | | 70–76 |
| 13 Feb | 20:30 | Lube Banca Macerata (Italy) | 2–3 | (Belgium) Noliko Maaseik | 25–17 | 25–22 | 21–25 | 22–25 | 14–16 | 107–105 |
| 13 Feb | 18:00 | Iraklis Thessaloniki (Greece) | 3–0 | (France) Tours VB | 25–21 | 25–17 | 25–22 | | | 75–60 |

=== Second leg ===
| Date | Time | | Score | | Set 1 | Set 2 | Set 3 | Set 4 | Set 5 | Total |
|---|---|---|---|---|---|---|---|---|---|---|
| 20 Feb | 18:00 | Mostostal Azoty KK (Poland) | 3–1 | (Germany) VfB Friedrichshafen | 25–21 | 20–25 | 25–20 | 25–17 | | 95–83 |
| 20 Feb | 19:00 | Olympiacos Piraeus (Greece) | 2–3 | (Russia) Luzhniki Moscow | 25–16 | 25–17 | 21–25 | 18–25 | 12–15 | 101–98 |
| 20 Mar | 20:30 | Noliko Maaseik (Belgium) | 0–3 | (Italy) Lube Banca Macerata | 22–25 | 24–26 | 19–25 | | | 65–76 |
| 20 Mar | 20:00 | Tours VB (France) | 0–3 | (Greece) Iraklis Thessaloniki | 18–25 | 24–26 | 21–25 | | | 63–76 |

== Final Four ==
- Place: (Poland) Opole
- All times are Central European Time (UTC+01:00).

Semifinals
23 March
(Poland) Mostostal Azoty KK | 1
(Greece) Olympiacos Piraeus | 3
23 March
(Italy) Lube Banca Macerata | 3
(Greece) Iraklis Thessaloniki | 2

Final
24 March
(Greece) Olympiacos Piraeus | 1
(Italy) Lube Banca Macerata | 3
3rd place match
24 March
(Poland) Mostostal Azoty KK | 2
(Greece) Iraklis Thessaloniki | 3

=== Semifinals ===
| Date | Time | | Score | | Set 1 | Set 2 | Set 3 | Set 4 | Set 5 | Total |
|---|---|---|---|---|---|---|---|---|---|---|
| 23 Mar | 20:00 | Mostostal Azoty KK (Poland) | 1–3 | (Greece) Olympiacos Piraeus | 23–25 | 26–24 | 23–25 | 23–25 | | 95–99 |
| 23 Mar | 17:00 | Lube Banca Macerata (Italy) | 3–2 | (Greece) Iraklis Thessaloniki | 15–25 | 25–18 | 25–20 | 20–25 | 15–11 | 100–99 |

=== 3rd place match ===
| Date | Time | | Score | | Set 1 | Set 2 | Set 3 | Set 4 | Set 5 | Total |
|---|---|---|---|---|---|---|---|---|---|---|
| 24 Mar | 15:00 | Mostostal Azoty KK (Poland) | 2–3 | (Greece) Iraklis Thessaloniki | 27–25 | 25–23 | 22–25 | 29–31 | 10–15 | 113–119 |

=== Final ===
| Date | Time | | Score | | Set 1 | Set 2 | Set 3 | Set 4 | Set 5 | Total |
|---|---|---|---|---|---|---|---|---|---|---|
| 24 Mar | 18:00 | Olympiacos Piraeus (Greece) | 1–3 | (Italy) Lube Banca Macerata | 18–25 | 22–25 | 29–27 | 23–25 | | 92–102 |

== Final standings ==
| Rank | Team |
|---|---|
| 1st place, gold medalist(s) | (Italy) Lube Banca Macerata |
| 2nd place, silver medalist(s) | (Greece) Olympiacos Piraeus |
| 3rd place, bronze medalist(s) | (Greece) Iraklis Thessaloniki |
| 4 | (Poland) Mostostal Azoty Kędzierzyn-Koźle |

2001–02 CEV Champions League winners
(Italy)
Lube Banca Macerata
1st title
