= E.A. Patras =

Greek omnisports club

- Full name: Enosi Athlopedion Patron
- Nicknames: Megali Kyria (The Great lady), Melanolefkoi (The Black-whites)
- Founded: 1927
- Ground: EAP Indoor Hall, Patras, Greece
- Capacity: 2,200
- League: A1
- 2010-2011: 5th
Home colours	Away colours

E.A. Patras is a Greek omnisports club founded in 1927 and based is in Patras. It is mostly known for its volleyball and boxing sections, which compete at the highest level in Greece. The volleyball section won the Greek championship in 1938, whereas the boxing section won the national title in 1979, 1983, 1984, 1988, and 1989.

== E.A. Patras Volleyball - A1 Ethniki ==
E.A. Patras was one of the protagonists after the establishment of the Greek volleyball league in the 1930s, winning the title in 1937-38 and being the runner-up in the seasons 1935-36, 1936–37 and 1939-1940.

E.A.P. returned to the first Greek league for the first time after the formation of the A1 Ethniki Volleyball, by winning the A2 Ethniki title in 1999. It took the fifth place in A1 Ethniki two times in a row (2003–04, 2004–05) and during those three years it participated in the European Federation Cup.

The season (2008–2009) was the most successful so far for EAP in the post-war period. It took the 3rd place in the national championship which allowed the club to participate once more to the European Federation Cup in the season 2009-2010.

The next season (2009–2010) the club held an impressive record during the regular season of the A1 Ethniki Volleyball with 18 wins, 4 losses, and 53 points, finishing in the second place, only behind Panathinaikos VC. But in the playoffs the club's performance was disappointing ending up in the 7th place of the league.

In the season 2010-2011, EAP finished in the fifth place in the championship.

== Greek Cup ==
Apart from Athens' and Thessaloniki's major volleyball clubs, EAP - representing Patras - was the fourth club from a provincial Greek city that made it to the final of the Greek Volleyball Cup, in the season 2007-2008. The previous ones were: Ethnikos Alexandroupolis (1981), Orestiada (1993) and Lamia (2007). In the final EAP lost 1-3 to Panathinaikos VC.

== Titles & honours ==
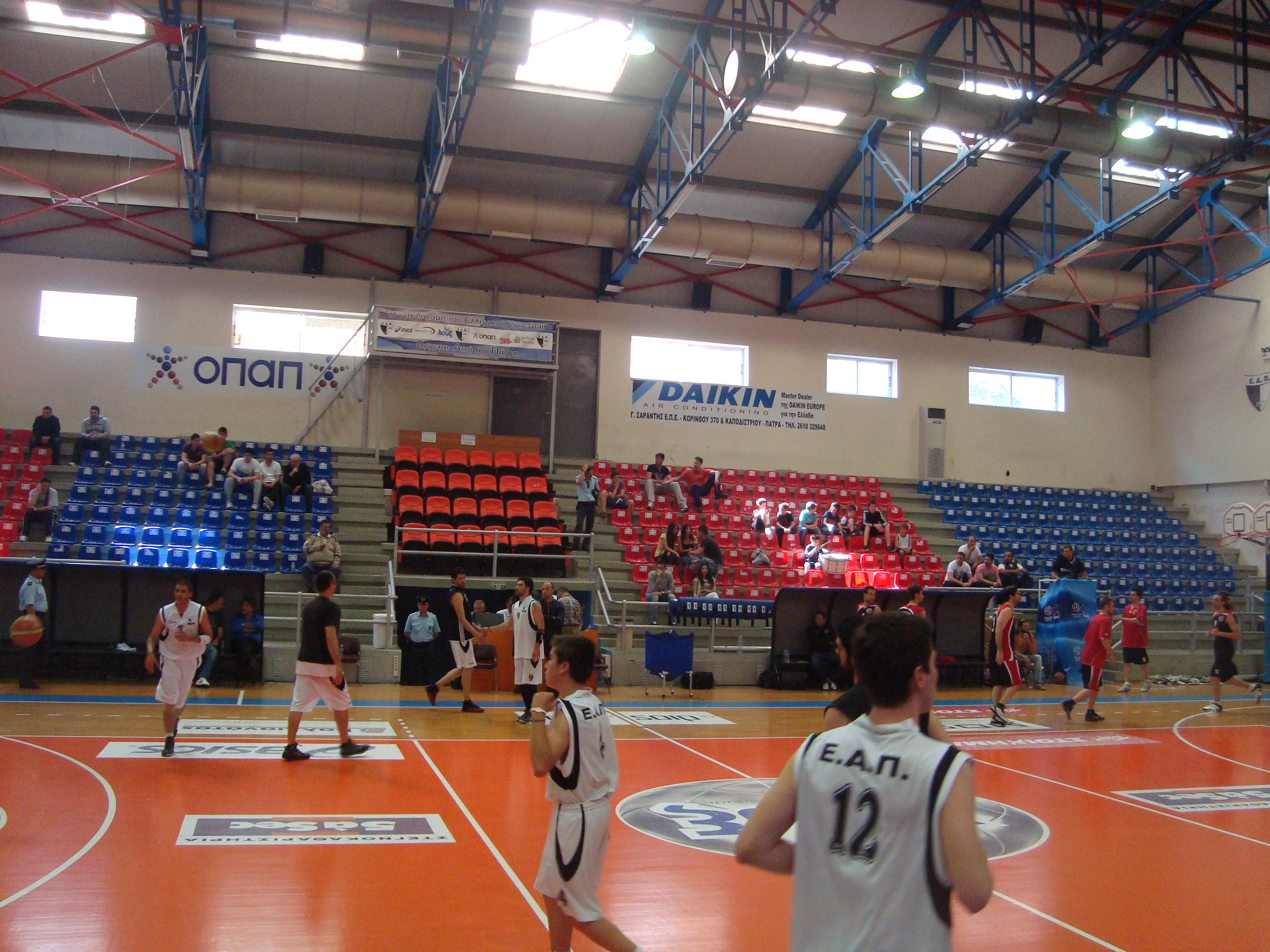
E.A. Patras indoor hall

- National: (1)
  - Greek Championship: 1938
- Divisional: (3)
  - Second Division (A2 Ethniki) Championship: 2002
  - Third Division (B Ethniki) Championship: 1996
  - Fourth Division (C Ethniki) Championship: 1993
- Greek Cup
  - Greek Cup finalist: 2008
- European Cup honours
  - European Federation Cup quarter finals: 2006
  - Challenge Cup final four: 2009
  - Challenge Cup semi finals: 2011

== Rankings in the Greek Volleyball Leagues ==
Season	Rank
1935-36	2nd
1936-37	2nd
1937-38	1st
1938-39	;
1939-40	2nd
1960-61	8th
1995-96	1st (B Ethniki)
1999-00	8th
2000-01	12th
2001-02	1st (A2)

Season	Rank
2002-03	8th
2003-04	5th
2004-05	5th
2005-06	6th
2006-07	7th
2007-08	5th
2008-09	3rd
2009-10	7th
2010-11	5th
2011-12	11th

== European Cup Honours ==
In 2005–06 E.A. Patras reached the quarter-finals of the European Federation Cup, being defeated twice by the Italian club of Macerata Volleyball (0–3 in Patras and 3–1 in Marche).

EAP also participated in the 2008–09 Challenge Cup's Final Four in İzmir, taking the fourth place.

In 2010–11 it participated in the Challenge Cup going up to the semi-finals, where it lost (like in 2006) two times (1–3, 3–0) to the further champions Macerata Volleyball.
