= Volleyball at the 2004 Summer Olympics – Men's team rosters =

This article shows the rosters of all participating teams at the men's indoor volleyball tournament at the 2004 Summer Olympics in Athens.

== Pool A ==
=== Argentina ===
The following is the Argentine roster in the men's volleyball tournament of the 2004 Summer Olympics.

Head coach: Alberto Armoa

| № | Name | Date of birth | Height | Weight | Spike | Block | 2004 club |
|---|---|---|---|---|---|---|---|
| 1 | Marcos Milinkovic (c) | 22 December 1971 | 2.05 m (6 ft 9 in) | 100 kg (220 lb) | 355 cm (140 in) | 338 cm (133 in) | (Brazil) Unisul Florianopolis |
| 2 | Jorge Elgueta | 21 November 1969 | 1.96 m (6 ft 5 in) | 96 kg (212 lb) | 353 cm (139 in) | 333 cm (131 in) | (Spain) Espi Pòrtol |
| 3 | Gustavo Porporatto | 7 May 1981 | 1.99 m (6 ft 6 in) | 91 kg (201 lb) | 353 cm (139 in) | 323 cm (127 in) | (Argentina) Club Social Monteros |
| 7 | Diego Gutierrez | 27 May 1976 | 1.86 m (6 ft 1 in) | 85 kg (187 lb) | 330 cm (130 in) | 315 cm (124 in) | (Germany) Evivo Düren |
| 8 | Hernan Ferraro | 13 May 1968 | 1.71 m (5 ft 7 in) | 74 kg (163 lb) | 300 cm (120 in) | 300 cm (120 in) | (Argentina) R. P. Coronel Vidal |
| 10 | Alejandro Spajic | 7 May 1976 | 2.04 m (6 ft 8 in) | 94 kg (207 lb) | 360 cm (140 in) | 340 cm (130 in) | (Argentina) Club Ciudad de Bolívar |
| 11 | Jerónimo Bidegain | 16 January 1977 | 2.00 m (6 ft 7 in) | 93 kg (205 lb) | 352 cm (139 in) | 335 cm (132 in) | (Argentina) Club Social Monteros |
| 12 | Pablo Peralta | 9 December 1979 | 2.04 m (6 ft 8 in) | 100 kg (220 lb) | 350 cm (140 in) | 330 cm (130 in) | (Spain) Tenerife |
| 13 | Santiago Darraidou | 24 November 1980 | 1.94 m (6 ft 4 in) | 95 kg (209 lb) | 345 cm (136 in) | 335 cm (132 in) | (Greece) Orestiada |
| 15 | Leonardo Patti | 6 July 1978 | 1.88 m (6 ft 2 in) | 88 kg (194 lb) | 340 cm (130 in) | 320 cm (130 in) | (Argentina) Club Ciudad de Bolívar |
| 17 | Pablo Meana (L) | 10 June 1975 | 1.87 m (6 ft 2 in) | 84 kg (185 lb) | 325 cm (128 in) | 315 cm (124 in) | (Russia) Lokomotiv |
| 18 | Gastón Giani | 26 April 1979 | 1.94 m (6 ft 4 in) | 86 kg (190 lb) | 345 cm (136 in) | 330 cm (130 in) | (Spain) Tenerife |

=== France ===
The following is the French roster in the men's volleyball tournament of the 2004 Summer Olympics.

Head coach: Philippe Blain

| № | Name | Date of birth | Height | Weight | Spike | Block | 2004 club |
|---|---|---|---|---|---|---|---|
| 2 | Hubert Henno (L) | 6 October 1976 | 1.88 m (6 ft 2 in) | 83 kg (183 lb) | 330 cm (130 in) | 310 cm (120 in) | (France) Tours VB |
| 3 | Dominique Daquin (c) | 10 November 1972 | 1.97 m (6 ft 6 in) | 85 kg (187 lb) | 352 cm (139 in) | 325 cm (128 in) | (Russia) VC Dynamo Moscow |
| 7 | Stéphane Antiga | 3 February 1976 | 2.00 m (6 ft 7 in) | 94 kg (207 lb) | 344 cm (135 in) | 321 cm (126 in) | (Italy) Bre Banca Lannutti Cuneo |
| 8 | Laurent Capet | 5 May 1972 | 2.02 m (6 ft 8 in) | 92 kg (203 lb) | 350 cm (140 in) | 325 cm (128 in) | (France) Tourcoing LM |
| 9 | Frantz Granvorka | 10 March 1976 | 1.95 m (6 ft 5 in) | 90 kg (200 lb) | 364 cm (143 in) | 327 cm (129 in) | (Greece) Iraklis VC |
| 10 | Vincent Montmeát | 1 September 1977 | 1.96 m (6 ft 5 in) | 88 kg (194 lb) | 348 cm (137 in) | 330 cm (130 in) | (France) Stade Poitevin Poitiers |
| 11 | Loïc De Kergret | 20 August 1970 | 1.93 m (6 ft 4 in) | 89 kg (196 lb) | 335 cm (132 in) | 315 cm (124 in) | (France) Tours VB |
| 14 | Philippe Barça-Cysique | 22 April 1977 | 1.94 m (6 ft 4 in) | 88 kg (194 lb) | 347 cm (137 in) | 325 cm (128 in) | (France) Nice VB |
| 15 | Guillaume Samica | 28 September 1981 | 1.96 m (6 ft 5 in) | 82 kg (181 lb) | 343 cm (135 in) | 318 cm (125 in) | (Italy) Bre Banca Lannutti Cuneo |
| 16 | Mathias Patin | 25 April 1974 | 1.85 m (6 ft 1 in) | 73 kg (161 lb) | 325 cm (128 in) | 315 cm (124 in) | (France) Paris Volley |
| 17 | Oliver Kieffer | 27 August 1979 | 2.00 m (6 ft 7 in) | 85 kg (187 lb) | 355 cm (140 in) | 335 cm (132 in) | (France) Paris Volley |
| 18 | Sébastien Frangolacci | 31 March 1976 | 1.92 m (6 ft 4 in) | 88 kg (194 lb) | 340 cm (130 in) | 322 cm (127 in) | (France) Paris Volley |

=== Greece ===
The following is the Greek roster in the men's volleyball tournament of the 2004 Summer Olympics.

Head coach: Stelios Prosalikas

| № | Name | Date of birth | Height | Weight | Spike | Block | 2004 club |
|---|---|---|---|---|---|---|---|
| 1 | Konstantinos Christofidelis | 26 June 1977 | 1.96 m (6 ft 5 in) | 87 kg (192 lb) | 341 cm (134 in) | 320 cm (130 in) | (Greece) Olympiacos |
| 2 | Marios Giourdas (c) | 2 March 1973 | 2.02 m (6 ft 8 in) | 90 kg (200 lb) | 356 cm (140 in) | 341 cm (134 in) | (Greece) Iraklis |
| 3 | Theodoros Chatziantoniou | 16 March 1974 | 2.04 m (6 ft 8 in) | 95 kg (209 lb) | 360 cm (140 in) | 350 cm (140 in) | (Greece) Olympiacos |
| 6 | Vasileios Kournetas | 2 August 1976 | 1.92 m (6 ft 4 in) | 82 kg (181 lb) | 336 cm (132 in) | 320 cm (130 in) | (Greece) Olympiacos |
| 7 | Georgios Stefanou (L) | 12 January 1981 | 1.87 m (6 ft 2 in) | 82 kg (181 lb) | 295 cm (116 in) | 305 cm (120 in) | (Greece) Panathinaikos |
| 10 | Antonios Tsakiropoulos | 1 July 1969 | 2.03 m (6 ft 8 in) | 93 kg (205 lb) | 350 cm (140 in) | 336 cm (132 in) | (Greece) Olympiacos |
| 11 | Nikolaos Roumeliotis | 12 October 1978 | 1.98 m (6 ft 6 in) | 97 kg (214 lb) | 343 cm (135 in) | 320 cm (130 in) | (Greece) EA Patras |
| 14 | Sotirios Pantaleon | 21 June 1980 | 1.98 m (6 ft 6 in) | 77 kg (170 lb) | 330 cm (130 in) | 312 cm (123 in) | (Greece) Panathinaikos |
| 15 | Ilias Lappas | 20 July 1979 | 1.95 m (6 ft 5 in) | 92 kg (203 lb) | 335 cm (132 in) | 320 cm (130 in) | (Greece) Panathinaikos |
| 16 | Andrej Kravárik | 28 July 1971 | 2.04 m (6 ft 8 in) | 97 kg (214 lb) | 360 cm (140 in) | 350 cm (140 in) | (Greece) Iraklis |
| 17 | Konstantinos Prousalis | 6 October 1980 | 1.92 m (6 ft 4 in) | 83 kg (183 lb) | 320 cm (130 in) | 295 cm (116 in) | (Greece) PAOK |
| 18 | Theodoros Baev | 31 May 1977 | 2.00 m (6 ft 7 in) | 95 kg (209 lb) | 340 cm (130 in) | 333 cm (131 in) | (Greece) Iraklis |

=== Poland ===
The following is the Polish roster in the men's volleyball tournament of the 2004 Summer Olympics.

Head coach: Stanisław Gościniak

| № | Name | Date of birth | Height | Weight | Spike | Block | 2004 club |
|---|---|---|---|---|---|---|---|
| 1 | Andrzej Stelmach | 15 August 1972 | 2.00 m (6 ft 7 in) | 98 kg (216 lb) | 330 cm (130 in) | 320 cm (130 in) | (Poland) Skra Bełchatów |
| 3 | Piotr Gruszka | 8 March 1977 | 2.06 m (6 ft 9 in) | 102 kg (225 lb) | 352 cm (139 in) | 325 cm (128 in) | (France) Tourcoing LM |
| 5 | Paweł Zagumny (c) | 18 October 1977 | 2.00 m (6 ft 7 in) | 88 kg (194 lb) | 336 cm (132 in) | 317 cm (125 in) | (Poland) AZS UWM Olsztyn |
| 6 | Dawid Murek | 24 July 1977 | 1.96 m (6 ft 5 in) | 94 kg (207 lb) | 341 cm (134 in) | 325 cm (128 in) | (Greece) Panathinaikos V.C. |
| 8 | Krzysztof Ignaczak (L) | 15 May 1972 | 1.88 m (6 ft 2 in) | 86 kg (190 lb) | 330 cm (130 in) | 315 cm (124 in) | (Poland) Skra Bełchatów |
| 11 | Łukasz Kadziewicz | 20 September 1980 | 2.06 m (6 ft 9 in) | 84 kg (185 lb) | 350 cm (140 in) | 328 cm (129 in) | (Poland) AZS UWM Olsztyn |
| 12 | Radosław Rybak | 25 March 1973 | 1.95 m (6 ft 5 in) | 90 kg (200 lb) | 356 cm (140 in) | 330 cm (130 in) | (Poland) Jastrzębski Węgiel |
| 13 | Sebastian Świderski | 26 June 1977 | 1.93 m (6 ft 4 in) | 88 kg (194 lb) | 354 cm (139 in) | 325 cm (128 in) | (Italy) Umbria Volley |
| 14 | Piotr Gabrych | 5 July 1972 | 1.97 m (6 ft 6 in) | 95 kg (209 lb) | 342 cm (135 in) | 318 cm (125 in) | (Poland) Jastrzębski Węgiel |
| 16 | Arkadiusz Gołaś | 10 May 1981 | 2.01 m (6 ft 7 in) | 82 kg (181 lb) | 365 cm (144 in) | 342 cm (135 in) | (Poland) AZS Częstochowa |
| 17 | Michał Bąkiewicz | 22 March 1981 | 1.96 m (6 ft 5 in) | 79 kg (174 lb) | 338 cm (133 in) | 324 cm (128 in) | (Poland) Skra Bełchatów |
| 18 | Robert Szczerbaniuk | 29 May 1977 | 1.99 m (6 ft 6 in) | 89 kg (196 lb) | 350 cm (140 in) | 327 cm (129 in) | (Poland) Zaksa Kędzierzyn-Koźle |

=== Serbia and Montenegro ===
The following is the Serbia and Montenegrin roster in the men's volleyball tournament of the 2004 Summer Olympics.

Head coach: Ljubomir Travica

| № | Name | Date of birth | Height | Weight | Spike | Block | 2004 club |
|---|---|---|---|---|---|---|---|
| 2 | Milan Vasić | 2 September 1980 | 2.04 m (6 ft 8 in) | 98 kg (216 lb) | 355 cm (140 in) | 330 cm (130 in) | (Italy) Pallavolo Loreto |
| 4 | Aleksandar Mitrović | 24 September 1982 | 1.93 m (6 ft 4 in) | 93 kg (205 lb) | 350 cm (140 in) | 324 cm (128 in) | (Serbia and Montenegro) Partizan Belgrade |
| 6 | Vladan Đorđević | 10 January 1983 | 1.94 m (6 ft 4 in) | 90 kg (200 lb) | 332 cm (131 in) | 318 cm (125 in) | (Serbia and Montenegro) Partizan Belgrade |
| 7 | Đula Mešter | 3 April 1972 | 2.03 m (6 ft 8 in) | 90 kg (200 lb) | 346 cm (136 in) | 325 cm (128 in) | (Serbia and Montenegro) Vojvodina Novolin |
| 8 | Vasa Mijić (L) | 11 April 1973 | 1.86 m (6 ft 1 in) | 80 kg (180 lb) | 332 cm (131 in) | 307 cm (121 in) | (Serbia and Montenegro) Vojvodina Novolin |
| 9 | Nikola Grbić (c) | 6 September 1973 | 1.94 m (6 ft 4 in) | 91 kg (201 lb) | 346 cm (136 in) | 320 cm (130 in) | (Italy) Copra Elior Piacenza |
| 10 | Vladimir Grbić | 14 December 1970 | 1.93 m (6 ft 4 in) | 87 kg (192 lb) | 360 cm (140 in) | 350 cm (140 in) | (Russia) Dynamo Moscow |
| 12 | Andrija Gerić | 24 January 1977 | 2.03 m (6 ft 8 in) | 101 kg (223 lb) | 350 cm (140 in) | 323 cm (127 in) | (Italy) Volley Lube |
| 13 | Goran Vujević | 27 February 1973 | 1.92 m (6 ft 4 in) | 94 kg (207 lb) | 339 cm (133 in) | 315 cm (124 in) | (Italy) Latina Volley |
| 14 | Ivan Miljković | 13 September 1979 | 2.06 m (6 ft 9 in) | 88 kg (194 lb) | 354 cm (139 in) | 333 cm (131 in) | (Italy) Volley Lube |
| 15 | Ivan Ilić | 19 December 1976 | 1.94 m (6 ft 4 in) | 85 kg (187 lb) | 337 cm (133 in) | 318 cm (125 in) | (Serbia and Montenegro) Budućnost Podgorica |
| 17 | Milan Marković | 20 January 1980 | 2.03 m (6 ft 8 in) | 101 kg (223 lb) | 348 cm (137 in) | 321 cm (126 in) | (Greece) Olympiacos |

=== Tunisia ===
The following is the Tunisian roster in the men's volleyball tournament of the 2004 Summer Olympics.

Head coach: Antonio Giacobbe

| № | Name | Date of birth | Height | Weight | Spike | Block | 2004 club |
|---|---|---|---|---|---|---|---|
| 2 | Mohamed Trabelsi | 15 September 1981 | 2.02 m (6 ft 8 in) | 92 kg (203 lb) | 340 cm (130 in) | 320 cm (130 in) | (Tunisia) CS Sfaxien |
| 3 | Mehdi Gara | 1 March 1981 | 1.89 m (6 ft 2 in) | 78 kg (172 lb) | 332 cm (131 in) | 317 cm (125 in) | (Tunisia) C.O. Kelibia |
| 4 | Walid Ben Abbes | 19 June 1980 | 1.86 m (6 ft 1 in) | 76 kg (168 lb) | 331 cm (130 in) | 308 cm (121 in) | Unattached |
| 5 | Samir Sellami | 13 July 1977 | 1.94 m (6 ft 4 in) | 82 kg (181 lb) | 320 cm (130 in) | 308 cm (121 in) | (Tunisia) CS Sfaxien |
| 7 | Chaker Ghezal | 14 January 1977 | 1.99 m (6 ft 6 in) | 90 kg (200 lb) | 352 cm (139 in) | 335 cm (132 in) | (Tunisia) E.S. Sahel |
| 9 | Khaled Belaïd | 30 December 1973 | 1.95 m (6 ft 5 in) | 82 kg (181 lb) | 326 cm (128 in) | 312 cm (123 in) | (Tunisia) CS Sfaxien |
| 11 | Marouane Fehri | 1 July 1979 | 1.97 m (6 ft 6 in) | 79 kg (174 lb) | 325 cm (128 in) | 306 cm (120 in) | (Tunisia) C.O. Kelibia |
| 13 | Noureddine Hfaiedh | 27 August 1973 | 1.97 m (6 ft 6 in) | 86 kg (190 lb) | 350 cm (140 in) | 315 cm (124 in) | (Tunisia) E.S. Sahel |
| 14 | Mehrez Berriri (L) | 13 April 1975 | 1.86 m (6 ft 1 in) | 80 kg (180 lb) | 328 cm (129 in) | 305 cm (120 in) | (Tunisia) CS Sfaxien |
| 15 | Ghazi Guidara (c) | 18 May 1974 | 1.86 m (6 ft 1 in) | 75 kg (165 lb) | 326 cm (128 in) | 305 cm (120 in) | (Tunisia) E.S. Tunis |
| 17 | Mohammed Slim Chekili | 15 March 1985 | 1.98 m (6 ft 6 in) | 82 kg (181 lb) | 328 cm (129 in) | 309 cm (122 in) | (Tunisia) C.O. Kelibia |
| 18 | Hosni Karamosly | 1 June 1980 | 1.97 m (6 ft 6 in) | 82 kg (181 lb) | 338 cm (133 in) | 315 cm (124 in) | (Tunisia) CS Sfaxien |

== Pool B ==
=== Australia ===
The following is the Australian roster in the men's volleyball tournament of the 2004 Summer Olympics.

Head coach: (Argentina) Jon Uriarte

| № | Name | Date of birth | Height | Weight | Spike | Block | 2004 club |
|---|---|---|---|---|---|---|---|
| 1 | Dan Howard (c) | 13 December 1976 | 2.08 m (6 ft 10 in) | 98 kg (216 lb) | 375 cm (148 in) | 340 cm (130 in) | (Italy) Marmi Lanza Verona |
| 3 | Grant Sorensen | 27 March 1982 | 1.99 m (6 ft 6 in) | 93 kg (205 lb) | 337 cm (133 in) | 328 cm (129 in) | (Australia) Australian Institute of Sport |
| 4 | Ben Hardy | 21 September 1974 | 1.98 m (6 ft 6 in) | 92 kg (203 lb) | 335 cm (132 in) | 320 cm (130 in) | (Italy) Brill Rover Bolzano |
| 5 | Luke Campbell | 8 November 1979 | 2.02 m (6 ft 8 in) | 98 kg (216 lb) | 346 cm (136 in) | 335 cm (132 in) | (Germany) SV Bayer Wuppertal |
| 7 | Matthew Young | 17 July 1981 | 1.87 m (6 ft 2 in) | 78 kg (172 lb) | 335 cm (132 in) | 323 cm (127 in) | (Spain) Jusam-Electronics |
| 9 | Andrew Earl | 15 September 1982 | 1.96 m (6 ft 5 in) | 85 kg (187 lb) | 336 cm (132 in) | 322 cm (127 in) | (Spain) Vigo |
| 10 | David Beard | 23 October 1973 | 1.97 m (6 ft 6 in) | 95 kg (209 lb) | 342 cm (135 in) | 325 cm (128 in) | (Australia) Australian Institute of Sport |
| 12 | Travis Moran (L) | 16 August 1985 | 1.91 m (6 ft 3 in) | 92 kg (203 lb) | 336 cm (132 in) | 320 cm (130 in) | (Australia) Australian Institute of Sport |
| 13 | David Ferguson | 13 March 1982 | 2.05 m (6 ft 9 in) | 92 kg (203 lb) | 348 cm (137 in) | 328 cm (129 in) | (Netherlands) Lycurgus |
| 14 | Zane Christensen | 19 July 1985 | 2.09 m (6 ft 10 in) | 103 kg (227 lb) | 368 cm (145 in) | 342 cm (135 in) | (Italy) Copra Asystel Piacenza |
| 15 | Hidde Van Beest | 20 July 1979 | 2.07 m (6 ft 9 in) | 106 kg (234 lb) | 350 cm (140 in) | 342 cm (135 in) | (Italy) 4Torri Ferrara Volley |
| 16 | Brett Alderman | 27 February 1979 | 1.91 m (6 ft 3 in) | 87 kg (192 lb) | 343 cm (135 in) | 328 cm (129 in) | (Germany) TSV Unterhaching |

=== Brazil ===
The following is the Brazilian roster in the men's volleyball tournament of the 2004 Summer Olympics.

Head coach: Bernardo Rezende

| № | Name | Date of birth | Height | Weight | Spike | Block | 2004 club |
|---|---|---|---|---|---|---|---|
| 3 | Giovane Gávio | 7 September 1970 | 1.96 m (6 ft 5 in) | 89 kg (196 lb) | 340 cm (130 in) | 322 cm (127 in) | (Brazil) Minas TC |
| 4 | André Heller | 17 December 1975 | 1.99 m (6 ft 6 in) | 93 kg (205 lb) | 339 cm (133 in) | 321 cm (126 in) | (Brazil) EC Unisul |
| 6 | Maurício Lima | 27 January 1968 | 1.84 m (6 ft 0 in) | 79 kg (174 lb) | 321 cm (126 in) | 304 cm (120 in) | (Italy) Gabeca Montichiari |
| 7 | Gilberto Godoy Filho | 23 December 1976 | 1.92 m (6 ft 4 in) | 85 kg (187 lb) | 325 cm (128 in) | 312 cm (123 in) | (Italy) Piemonte Cuneo |
| 9 | André Nascimento | 3 April 1979 | 1.95 m (6 ft 5 in) | 95 kg (209 lb) | 340 cm (130 in) | 320 cm (130 in) | (Brazil) Minas TC |
| 10 | Sérgio Santos (L) | 15 October 1975 | 1.84 m (6 ft 0 in) | 78 kg (172 lb) | 325 cm (128 in) | 310 cm (120 in) | (Brazil) EC Banespa |
| 11 | Anderson Rodrigues | 21 May 1974 | 1.90 m (6 ft 3 in) | 95 kg (209 lb) | 330 cm (130 in) | 321 cm (126 in) | (Japan) NEC Blue Rockets |
| 12 | Nalbert Bitencourt (c) | 9 March 1974 | 1.95 m (6 ft 5 in) | 82 kg (181 lb) | 329 cm (130 in) | 309 cm (122 in) | (Italy) Lube Macerata |
| 13 | Gustavo Endres | 23 August 1975 | 2.03 m (6 ft 8 in) | 98 kg (216 lb) | 337 cm (133 in) | 325 cm (128 in) | (Italy) Icom Latina |
| 14 | Rodrigo Santana | 17 April 1979 | 2.05 m (6 ft 9 in) | 85 kg (187 lb) | 350 cm (140 in) | 328 cm (129 in) | (Italy) 4Torri Ferrara |
| 17 | Ricardo Garcia | 17 April 1979 | 1.91 m (6 ft 3 in) | 89 kg (196 lb) | 337 cm (133 in) | 320 cm (130 in) | (Brazil) Minas TC |
| 18 | Dante Amaral | 30 September 1980 | 2.01 m (6 ft 7 in) | 86 kg (190 lb) | 345 cm (136 in) | 327 cm (129 in) | (Italy) Daytona Modena |

=== Italy ===
The following is the Italian roster in the men's volleyball tournament of the 2004 Summer Olympics.

Head coach: Gian Paolo Montali

| № | Name | Date of birth | Height | Weight | Spike | Block | 2004 club |
|---|---|---|---|---|---|---|---|
| 1 | Luigi Mastrangelo | 17 August 1975 | 2.02 m (6 ft 8 in) | 90 kg (200 lb) | 368 cm (145 in) | 336 cm (132 in) | (Italy) Lube Banca Marche |
| 5 | Valerio Vermiglio | 1 March 1976 | 1.90 m (6 ft 3 in) | 83 kg (183 lb) | 342 cm (135 in) | 320 cm (130 in) | (Italy) Sisley Volley |
| 6 | Samuele Papi | 20 May 1973 | 1.90 m (6 ft 3 in) | 84 kg (185 lb) | 345 cm (136 in) | 308 cm (121 in) | (Italy) Sisley Volley |
| 7 | Andrea Sartoretti | 19 June 1971 | 1.94 m (6 ft 4 in) | 88 kg (194 lb) | 353 cm (139 in) | 319 cm (126 in) | (Italy) Itas Diatec Trentino |
| 8 | Alberto Cisolla | 10 October 1977 | 1.97 m (6 ft 6 in) | 86 kg (190 lb) | 367 cm (144 in) | 345 cm (136 in) | (Italy) Sisley Volley |
| 11 | Venceslav Simeonov | 3 February 1977 | 2.00 m (6 ft 7 in) | 105 kg (231 lb) | 358 cm (141 in) | 335 cm (132 in) | (Italy) Sempre Volley |
| 12 | Damiano Pippi (L) | 23 August 1971 | 1.93 m (6 ft 4 in) | 84 kg (185 lb) | 323 cm (127 in) | 305 cm (120 in) | (Italy) Kerakoll Modena |
| 13 | Andrea Giani (c) | 22 April 1970 | 1.96 m (6 ft 5 in) | 97 kg (214 lb) | 356 cm (140 in) | 322 cm (127 in) | (Italy) Kerakoll Modena |
| 14 | Alessandro Fei | 29 November 1978 | 2.04 m (6 ft 8 in) | 90 kg (200 lb) | 352 cm (139 in) | 321 cm (126 in) | (Italy) Sisley Volley |
| 15 | Paolo Tofoli | 14 August 1966 | 1.88 m (6 ft 2 in) | 81 kg (179 lb) | 345 cm (136 in) | 321 cm (126 in) | (Italy) Itas Diatec Trentino |
| 17 | Paolo Cozzi | 26 May 1980 | 2.00 m (6 ft 7 in) | 86 kg (190 lb) | 363 cm (143 in) | 328 cm (129 in) | (Italy) Kerakoll Modena |
| 18 | Matej Černič | 13 September 1978 | 1.92 m (6 ft 4 in) | 80 kg (180 lb) | 354 cm (139 in) | 335 cm (132 in) | (Italy) Kerakoll Modena |

=== Netherlands ===
The following is the Dutch roster in the men's volleyball tournament of the 2004 Summer Olympics.

Head coach: Bert Goedkoop

| № | Name | Date of birth | Height | Weight | Spike | Block | 2004 club |
|---|---|---|---|---|---|---|---|
| 1 | Dirk-Jan van Gendt | 18 July 1974 | 1.85 m (6 ft 1 in) | 78 kg (172 lb) | 332 cm (131 in) | 313 cm (123 in) | (Netherlands) Ortec Rotterdam Nesselande |
| 2 | Nico Freriks | 22 December 1981 | 1.91 m (6 ft 3 in) | 85 kg (187 lb) | 327 cm (129 in) | 306 cm (120 in) | (Netherlands) Omniworld |
| 3 | Marko Klok (L) | 14 March 1968 | 1.94 m (6 ft 4 in) | 88 kg (194 lb) | 342 cm (135 in) | 329 cm (130 in) | (Netherlands) Ortec Rotterdam Nesselande |
| 4 | Reinder Nummerdor (c) | 10 September 1976 | 1.94 m (6 ft 4 in) | 87 kg (192 lb) | 342 cm (135 in) | 321 cm (126 in) | (Italy) Estense Carife Ferrara |
| 5 | Guido Görtzen | 9 November 1970 | 1.98 m (6 ft 6 in) | 98 kg (216 lb) | 349 cm (137 in) | 340 cm (130 in) | (Italy) Umbria Volley |
| 6 | Richard Schuil | 2 May 1973 | 2.02 m (6 ft 8 in) | 92 kg (203 lb) | 347 cm (137 in) | 329 cm (130 in) | (Italy) Gioia del Colle Volley |
| 7 | Mike van de Goor | 14 May 1973 | 2.06 m (6 ft 9 in) | 96 kg (212 lb) | 350 cm (140 in) | 322 cm (127 in) | (Netherlands) Piet Zoomers Apeldoorn |
| 9 | Jeroen Trommel | 1 August 1980 | 1.94 m (6 ft 4 in) | 89 kg (196 lb) | 340 cm (130 in) | 310 cm (120 in) | (Netherlands) Omniworld |
| 12 | Robert Horstink | 26 December 1981 | 2.01 m (6 ft 7 in) | 84 kg (185 lb) | 326 cm (128 in) | 311 cm (122 in) | (Netherlands) Piet Zoomers Apeldoorn |
| 14 | Kay van Dijk | 25 June 1984 | 2.12 m (6 ft 11 in) | 96 kg (212 lb) | 352 cm (139 in) | 345 cm (136 in) | (Netherlands) VC Zwolle |
| 17 | Rob Bontje | 12 May 1981 | 2.06 m (6 ft 9 in) | 85 kg (187 lb) | 366 cm (144 in) | 340 cm (130 in) | (Netherlands) Ortec Rotterdam Nesselande |
| 18 | Albert Cristina | 18 November 1970 | 1.94 m (6 ft 4 in) | 94 kg (207 lb) | 342 cm (135 in) | 320 cm (130 in) | (Netherlands) Omniworld |

=== Russia ===
The following is the Russian roster in the men's volleyball tournament of the 2004 Summer Olympics.

Head coach: Gennady Shipulin

| № | Name | Date of birth | Height | Weight | Spike | Block | 2004 club |
|---|---|---|---|---|---|---|---|
| 1 | Stanislav Dineykin | 10 October 1973 | 2.15 m (7 ft 1 in) | 101 kg (223 lb) | 353 cm (139 in) | 342 cm (135 in) | (Italy) Sisley Volley Treviso |
| 4 | Sergei Baranov | 10 August 1981 | 2.08 m (6 ft 10 in) | 94 kg (207 lb) | 355 cm (140 in) | 343 cm (135 in) | (Russia) Lokomotiv Belgorod |
| 5 | Pavel Abramov | 23 April 1979 | 1.98 m (6 ft 6 in) | 89 kg (196 lb) | 347 cm (137 in) | 336 cm (132 in) | (Japan) Toray Arrows |
| 7 | Aleksey Kazakov | 18 March 1976 | 2.17 m (7 ft 1 in) | 102 kg (225 lb) | 355 cm (140 in) | 342 cm (135 in) | (Italy) Trentino Volley |
| 8 | Sergey Tetyukhin | 23 September 1975 | 1.97 m (6 ft 6 in) | 89 kg (196 lb) | 345 cm (136 in) | 338 cm (133 in) | (Russia) Lokomotiv Belgorod |
| 9 | Vadim Khamuttskikh (c) | 26 November 1969 | 1.96 m (6 ft 5 in) | 85 kg (187 lb) | 342 cm (135 in) | 331 cm (130 in) | (Russia) Lokomotiv Belgorod |
| 10 | Aleksandr Kosarev | 30 September 1977 | 2.00 m (6 ft 7 in) | 90 kg (200 lb) | 339 cm (133 in) | 328 cm (129 in) | (Russia) Lokomotiv Belgorod |
| 11 | Konstantin Ushakov | 24 March 1970 | 1.98 m (6 ft 6 in) | 77 kg (170 lb) | 343 cm (135 in) | 332 cm (131 in) | (Russia) Dynamo Moscow |
| 12 | Taras Khtey | 22 May 1982 | 2.05 m (6 ft 9 in) | 92 kg (203 lb) | 345 cm (136 in) | 335 cm (132 in) | (Russia) Dynamo Moscow |
| 14 | Andrey Egorchev | 28 February 1978 | 2.05 m (6 ft 9 in) | 103 kg (227 lb) | 343 cm (135 in) | 330 cm (130 in) | (Russia) Lokomotiv Belgorod |
| 16 | Aleksey Verbov (L) | 31 January 1982 | 1.83 m (6 ft 0 in) | 75 kg (165 lb) | 315 cm (124 in) | 310 cm (120 in) | (Russia) Lokomotiv Belgorod |
| 18 | Aleksey Kuleshov | 24 February 1979 | 2.06 m (6 ft 9 in) | 92 kg (203 lb) | 353 cm (139 in) | 340 cm (130 in) | (Russia) Lokomotiv Belgorod |

=== United States ===
The following is the American roster in the men's volleyball tournament of the 2004 Summer Olympics.

Head coach: Doug Beal

| № | Name | Date of birth | Height | Weight | Spike | Block | 2004 club |
|---|---|---|---|---|---|---|---|
| 1 | Lloy Ball (c) | 17 February 1972 | 2.03 m (6 ft 8 in) | 99 kg (218 lb) | 351 cm (138 in) | 316 cm (124 in) | (Italy) Daytona Modena |
| 5 | Erik Sullivan (L) | 9 August 1972 | 1.93 m (6 ft 4 in) | 88 kg (194 lb) | 340 cm (130 in) | 320 cm (130 in) | (Russia) Iskra Odintsovo |
| 6 | Phillip Eatherton | 2 January 1974 | 2.05 m (6 ft 9 in) | 97 kg (214 lb) | 356 cm (140 in) | 335 cm (132 in) | (Spain) Numancia Soria |
| 7 | Donald Suxho | 21 February 1976 | 1.95 m (6 ft 5 in) | 99 kg (218 lb) | 337 cm (133 in) | 319 cm (126 in) | (Turkey) Erdemirspor |
| 8 | William Priddy | 1 October 1977 | 1.93 m (6 ft 4 in) | 88 kg (194 lb) | 353 cm (139 in) | 330 cm (130 in) | Unattached |
| 9 | Ryan Millar | 22 January 1978 | 2.03 m (6 ft 8 in) | 99 kg (218 lb) | 354 cm (139 in) | 326 cm (128 in) | (Italy) Gabeca Bossini Montichiari |
| 10 | Riley Salmon | 2 July 1976 | 1.90 m (6 ft 3 in) | 86 kg (190 lb) | 345 cm (136 in) | 331 cm (130 in) | (Russia) Iskra Odintsovo |
| 11 | Brook Billings | 30 April 1980 | 1.98 m (6 ft 6 in) | 95 kg (209 lb) | 351 cm (138 in) | 331 cm (130 in) | (Japan) Sakai Blazers |
| 12 | Tom Hoff | 9 June 1973 | 2.03 m (6 ft 8 in) | 99 kg (218 lb) | 353 cm (139 in) | 333 cm (131 in) | (Greece) Iraklis Thessaloniki |
| 13 | Clay Stanley | 20 January 1978 | 2.05 m (6 ft 9 in) | 106 kg (234 lb) | 357 cm (141 in) | 332 cm (131 in) | (Greece) Panathinaikos |
| 14 | Kevin Barnett | 14 May 1974 | 1.98 m (6 ft 6 in) | 95 kg (209 lb) | 353 cm (139 in) | 340 cm (130 in) | Unattached |
| 15 | Gabriel Gardner | 18 March 1976 | 2.05 m (6 ft 9 in) | 99 kg (218 lb) | 353 cm (139 in) | 335 cm (132 in) | (Brazil) União Suzano |
