= 2001 African Volleyball Clubs Champions Championship =

Tournament details
- Host country: Tunisia
- City: Sousse
- Dates: 7 May 2001 – 15 May 2001
- Teams: 17 (from 1 confederation)
- Venue: 2 (in 1 host city)

Final positions
- Champions: (Tunisia) Étoile Sportive du Sahel (1st title)
- Runners-up: (Tunisia) CS Sfaxien

The 2001 African Volleyball Clubs Champions Championship was the 20th edition of African's premier club volleyball tournament held in Sousse, Tunisia.

== Final ==
Date	Time		Score		Set 1	Set 2	Set 3	Set 4	Set 5	Total	Report
15 Mai		'Étoile du Sahel (Tunisia) '	3–0	(Tunisia) CS Sfaxien	25–20	27–25	25–21			77–66	

== Squads ==
- Étoile du Sahel
  3-Slim Chebbi (c), 4-Makram Temimi, 5-Khaled Maâref, 6-Yosri Handous, 7-Chaker Ghezal, 8-Mohamed Ben Slimène, 9-Noureddine Hfaiedh, 10-Hichem Ben Romdhane, 11-Tarak Sammari, 12-Salem Mejri, and 14-Walid Abbès. Head Coach: Bahri Trabelsi.
- CS Sfaxien
  1-Ghazi Koubaâ (c), 2-Riadh Hedhili, 3-Foued Loukil, 5-Samir Sellami, 8-Houssem Ayadi, 9-Nassim Hadroug, 10-Mejdi Toumi, 12-Héctor Soto, 13-Jawhar Ben Abdallah, and 16-Zied Larguech. Head Coach: Foued Kammoun.
