= 2016 Arab Volleyball Clubs Champions Championship =

Tournament details
- Host country: Tunisia
- Cities: Sousse, M'saken
- Dates: 19 – 28 February 2016
- Teams: 17 (from 2 confederations)
- Venues: 2 (in 2 host cities)

Final positions
- Champions: (Tunisia) Étoile Sportive du Sahel (2nd title)
- Runners-up: (Egypt) Smouha SC

Tournament statistics
- Best player: (Tunisia) Amenallah Hmissi

The 2016 Arab Clubs Champions Championship was the 34th edition of Arab world's premier club volleyball tournament held in Sousse and M'saken.

== Group stage ==
The draw was held on 23 January 2016 in Bahrain.

Pool A	Pool B	Pool C	Pool D
(Tunisia) Étoile Sportive du Sahel; (Qatar) El Jaish SC; (Egypt) Smouha SC; (Libya) Al-Ahli Tripoli; (Oman) Al-Seeb Club	(Saudi Arabia) Al-Ahli; (Oman) Sohar SC; (Tunisia) CS Sfaxien; (Lebanon) Al Anwar Al Jadida	(Qatar) Al Rayyan; (Palestine) Sinjil Club; (Bahrain) Al Nasr; (Lebanon) Zahra Club; (Jordan) Wadi Mousa Club	(Libya) As-Swehly; (Saudi Arabia) Al Ittihad; (Jordan) Shabab Al Hussein

=== Pool A ===
Pos	Team	Pld	W	L	Pts	SW	SL	SR	SPW	SPL	SPR	Qualification
1	(Tunisia) Étoile Sportive du Sahel	4	4	0	12	12	1	12.000	327	258	1.267	Quarterfinals
2	(Egypt) Smouha SC	4	2	2	7	8	8	1.000	342	355	0.963	Quarterfinals
3	(Libya) Al-Ahli Tripoli	4	2	2	5	9	10	0.900	409	402	1.017	
4	(Qatar) El Jaish SC	4	2	2	5	7	8	0.875	350	344	1.017	
5	(Oman) Al-Seeb Club	4	0	4	1	3	12	0.250	296	365	0.811	

Date	Time		Score		Set 1	Set 2	Set 3	Set 4	Set 5	Total	Report
19 Feb	14:00	Smouha SC (Egypt)	3–1	(Oman) Al-Seeb Club	25–16	25–14	24–26	25-20		99–56	
19 Feb	17:00	Étoile Sportive du Sahel (Tunisia)	3-1	(Libya) Al-Ahli Tripoli	21–25	25–19	26–24	25-20	-	97–68	
20 Feb	14:00	Al-Ahli Tripoli (Libya)	3–2	(Oman) Al-Seeb Club	25–20	25–21	28–30	22-25	15-9	115–71	
20 Feb	17:00	Étoile Sportive du Sahel (Tunisia)	3–0	(Qatar) El Jaish SC	25–21	25–17	30–28	–	-	80–66	
21 Feb	11:00	El Jaish SC (Qatar)	3–2	(Libya) Al-Ahli Tripoli	20–25	24–26	25–19	25-18	15-13	109–70	
21 Feb	17:00	Étoile Sportive du Sahel (Tunisia)	3–0	(Egypt) Smouha SC	25–22	25–16	25–16			75–54	
23 Feb	14:00	Smouha SC (Egypt)	3–1	(Qatar) El Jaish SC	25–23	18–25	26–24	29-27	-	98–72	
23 Feb	17:00	Étoile Sportive du Sahel (Tunisia)	3–0	(Oman) Al-Seeb Club	25–13	25–16	25–21			75–50	
24 Feb	13:00	El Jaish SC (Qatar)	3–0	(Oman) Al-Seeb Club	25–23	25–18	25–23	-	-	75–64	
24 Feb	15:00	Smouha SC (Egypt)	2–3	(Libya) Al-Ahli Tripoli	25–17	18–25	19–25	25-23	04-15	91–67	

=== Pool B ===
Pos	Team	Pld	W	L	Pts	SW	SL	SR	SPW	SPL	SPR	Qualification
1	(Tunisia) CS Sfaxien	3	3	0	9	9	1	9.000	253	195	1.297	Quarterfinals
2	(Lebanon) Al Anwar Al Jadida	3	1	2	4	5	7	0.714	248	286	0.867	Quarterfinals
3	(Saudi Arabia) Al-Ahli	3	1	2	3	5	8	0.625	287	275	1.044	
4	(Oman) Sohar SC	3	1	2	2	5	8	0.625	271	303	0.894	

Date	Time		Score		Set 1	Set 2	Set 3	Set 4	Set 5	Total	Report
19 Feb	17:00	Sohar SC (Oman)	1–3	(Lebanon) Al Anwar Al Jadida	22–25	27–29	25–20	22–25		96–99	
20 Feb	15:00	CS Sfaxien (Tunisia)	3–0	(Saudi Arabia) Al-Arabi SC	25–19	26–24	27–25	–	–	78–68	
21 Feb	11:00	Al-Ahli (Saudi Arabia)	2–3	(Oman) Sohar SC	23–25	20–25	25–11	26–24	10-15	104–85	
21 Feb	15:00	Al Anwar Al Jadida (Lebanon)	0–3	(Tunisia) CS Sfaxien	19–25	14–25	19–25	–		52–75	
23 Feb	15:00	CS Sfaxien (Tunisia)	3–1	(Oman) Sohar SC	24–26	26–24	25–13	25–12		100–75	
24 Feb	17:00	Al Anwar Al Jadida (Lebanon)	2–3	(Saudi Arabia) Al-Ahli	29–27	25–23	19–25	14–25	10-15	97–100	

=== Pool C ===
Pos	Team	Pld	W	L	Pts	SW	SL	SR	SPW	SPL	SPR	Qualification
1	(Qatar) Al Rayyan	4	4	0	12	12	1	12.000	322	249	1.293	Quarterfinals
2	(Bahrain) Al Nasr	4	3	1	9	10	4	2.500	337	277	1.217	Quarterfinals
3	(Lebanon) Zahra Club	4	2	2	6	7	6	1.167	301	265	1.136	
4	(Jordan) Wadi Mousa Club	4	1	3	3	3	9	0.333	222	282	0.787	
5	(Palestine) Sinjil Club	4	0	4	0	0	12	0.000	191	300	0.637	

Date	Time		Score		Set 1	Set 2	Set 3	Set 4	Set 5	Total	Report
19 Feb	11:00	Al Nasr (Bahrain)	3–1	(Lebanon) Zahra Club	25–18	25–20	19–25	25-21	-	94–63	
19 Feb	14:00	Al Rayyan (Qatar)	3-0	(Palestine) Sinjil Club	25–15	25–12	25–08	–	–	75–35	
20 Feb	12:00	Wadi Mousa Club (Jordan)	0-3	(Qatar) Al Rayyan	14–25	20–25	20-25	–	-	54–50	
20 Feb	17:00	Sinjil Club (Palestine)	0-3	(Lebanon) Zahra Club	21–25	15–25	15-25	–	-	51–50	
21 Feb	13:00	Al Nasr (Bahrain)	3–0	(Jordan) Wadi Mousa Club	25–16	25–17	25–15			75–48	
21 Feb	17:00	Zahra Club (Lebanon)	0–3	(Qatar) Al Rayyan	23–25	23–25	21–25	-	-	67–75	
23 Feb	13:00	Al Nasr (Bahrain)	3-0	(Palestine) Sinjil Club	25–12	25–16	25-20	–	-	75–28	
23 Feb	17:00	Wadi Mousa Club (Jordan)	0–3	(Lebanon) Zahra Club	11–25	17–25	17–25	-	-	45–75	
24 Feb	13:00	Wadi Mousa Club (Jordan)	3–0	(Palestine) Sinjil Club	25–17	25–20	25–20			75–57	
24 Feb	15:00	Al Rayyan (Qatar)	3–1	(Bahrain) Al Nasr	25–19	29–27	18–25	25-22	-	97–71	

=== Pool D ===
Pos	Team	Pld	W	L	Pts	SW	SL	SR	SPW	SPL	SPR	Qualification
1	(Libya) As-Swehly	2	2	0	6	6	0	MAX	155	122	1.270	Quarterfinals
2	(Saudi Arabia) Al Ittihad	2	1	1	3	3	3	1.000	137	138	0.993	Quarterfinals
3	(Jordan) Shabab Al Hussein	2	0	2	0	0	6	0.000	127	159	0.799	

Date	Time		Score		Set 1	Set 2	Set 3	Set 4	Set 5	Total	Report
19 Feb	11:00	Shabab Al Hussein (Jordan)	0–3	(Saudi Arabia) Al Ittihad	27–29	15–25	21–25	-	-	63–79	
21 Feb	14:00	Al Ittihad (Saudi Arabia)	0–3	(Libya) As-Swehly	19–25	17–25	22–25	–		58–75	
23 Feb	14:00	As-Swehly (Libya)	3–0	(Jordan) Shabab Al Hussein	25–17	30–28	25–19	–		80–64	

== Knockout stage ==
Quarter-finals
26 February, 23-25 19-25 22-25
(Qatar) Al Rayyan	0
(Egypt) Smouha SC	3
26 February, 25-08 25-13 25-14
(Tunisia) CS Sfaxien	3
(Saudi Arabia) Al Ittihad	0
26 February, 25-16 25-17 26-24
(Tunisia) Étoile du Sahel	3
(Bahrain) Al Nasr	0
26 February, 25-15 25-16 25-12
(Libya) As-Swehly	3
(Lebanon) AlAnwar Al Jadida	0

Semi-finals
27 February, 25-22 27-25 20-25 23-25 13-15
(Tunisia) CS Sfaxien	2
(Egypt) Smouha SC	3
27 February, 25-18 25-13 22-25 25-17
(Tunisia) Étoile du Sahel	3
(Libya) As-Swehly	1

Final
28 February, 25-19 25-18 19-25 31-29
(Tunisia) Étoile du Sahel	3
(Egypt) Smouha SC	1
Third place
28 February, 25-20 25-23 25-11
(Tunisia) CS Sfaxien	3
(Libya) As-Swehly	0

=== Quarterfinals ===
Date	Time		Score		Set 1	Set 2	Set 3	Set 4	Set 5	Total	Report
26 Feb	12:00	Al Rayyan (Qatar)	0-3	(Egypt) Smouha SC	23-25	19-25	22-25	-	-	64–0	
26 Feb	14:30	CS Sfaxien (Tunisia)	2–3	(Saudi Arabia) Al Ittihad	25-08	25-13	25-14	-	-	75–0	
26 Feb	17:00	Étoile Sportive du Sahel (Tunisia)	3–0	(Bahrain) Al Nasr	25-16	25-17	26-24	-	-	76–0	
26 Feb	19:00	As-Swehly (Libya)	3–0	(Lebanon) Al Anwar Al Jadida	25-15	25-16	25-12	-	-	75–0	

=== Semifinals ===
Date	Time		Score		Set 1	Set 2	Set 3	Set 4	Set 5	Total	Report
27 Feb	17:00	Smouha SC (Egypt)	3-2	(Tunisia) CS Sfaxien	22-25	25-27	25-20	25-23	15-13	112–0	
27 Feb	19:00	Étoile Sportive du Sahel (Tunisia)	3–1	(Libya) As-Swehly	25-18	25-13	22-25	25-17	-	97–0	

=== Bronze medal match ===
Date	Time		Score		Set 1	Set 2	Set 3	Set 4	Set 5	Total	Report
28 Feb	14:00	CS Sfaxien (Tunisia)	3–0	(Libya) As-Swehly	25-20	25-23	25-11	-	-	75–0	

=== Final ===
Date	Time		Score		Set 1	Set 2	Set 3	Set 4	Set 5	Total	Report
28 Feb	17:00	Étoile Sportive du Sahel (Tunisia)	3–1	(Egypt) Smouha SC	25-19	25-18	19-25	31-29	-	100–0	

== Final standing ==
Rank	Team
1st place, gold medalist(s)	(Tunisia) Étoile Sportive du Sahel
2nd place, silver medalist(s)	(Egypt) Smouha SC
3rd place, bronze medalist(s)	(Tunisia) CS Sfaxien
4	(Libya) As-Swehly
5	(Qatar) Al Rayyan
6	(Bahrain) Al Nasr
7	(Saudi Arabia) Al Ittihad
8	(Lebanon) Al Anwar Al Jadida
9	(Lebanon) Zahra Club
10	(Saudi Arabia) Al-Ahli
11	(Libya) Al-Ahli Tripoli
12	(Jordan) Shabab Al Hussein
13	(Qatar) El Jaish SC
14	(Oman) Sohar SC
15	(Jordan) Wadi Mousa Club
16	(Oman) Al-Seeb Club
17	(Palestine) Sinjil Club

2016 Club Arab Champions

2nd title

12–man roster
Kadhi, Mrabet, Garci, Ben Massoud, Nagga, Galić, Hmissi, Ayech, Taouerghi, Jerbi (c), Ben Ali, Karamosly
Head coach
Kammoun
Assistant
Hfaiedh

== Awards ==
- Most valuable player
  (Tunisia) Amenallah Hmissi (Étoile Sportive du Sahel)
- Best setter
  (Algeria) Amir Kerboua (Smouha SC)
- Best outside spikers
  (Tunisia) Walid Abbes (CS Sfaxien)
  (Egypt) Mohamed Gabal (Smouha SC)
- Best middle blockers
  (Tunisia) Ahmed Kadhi (Étoile Sportive du Sahel)
  (Egypt) Mohamed Abu Rayya (Smouha SC)
- Best opposite spiker
  (Tunisia) Marouen Garci (Étoile Sportive du Sahel)
- Best libero
  (Libya) Hamid Ali Mustafa (As-Swehly)
