= Omar Agrebi =

Tunisian volleyball player (born 1992)

Personal information
- Full name: Omar Agrebi
- Nationality: Tunisia
- Born: August 26, 1992; Sfax, Tunisia
- Hometown: Sfax, Tunisia
- Height: 2.05 m (6 ft 8 1/2 in)
- Weight: 85 kg (187 lb)

Volleyball information
- Position: Middle Blocker
- Current club: (Tunisia) CS Sfaxien
- Number: 6

National team
2012 -	Tunisia
- Last updated: December 2013

Omar Agrebi (Arabic: عمر العقربي) (born 26 August 1992 in Sfax, Tunisia) is a Tunisian volleyball player. He is 195 cm high and plays as middle blocker.

== Clubs ==
Club	Nation	Years
UST de Sfax	Tunisia	2009–2012
CS Sfaxien	Tunisia	2012–present

== Awards ==
=== Club ===
- Arab Clubs Championship (2013)
- Tunisian League (2013)

=== National team ===
- African Championship U21 (2010)
- Arab Championship U19 (2009)
