= Hamza Nagga =

Tunisian volleyball player (born 1990)

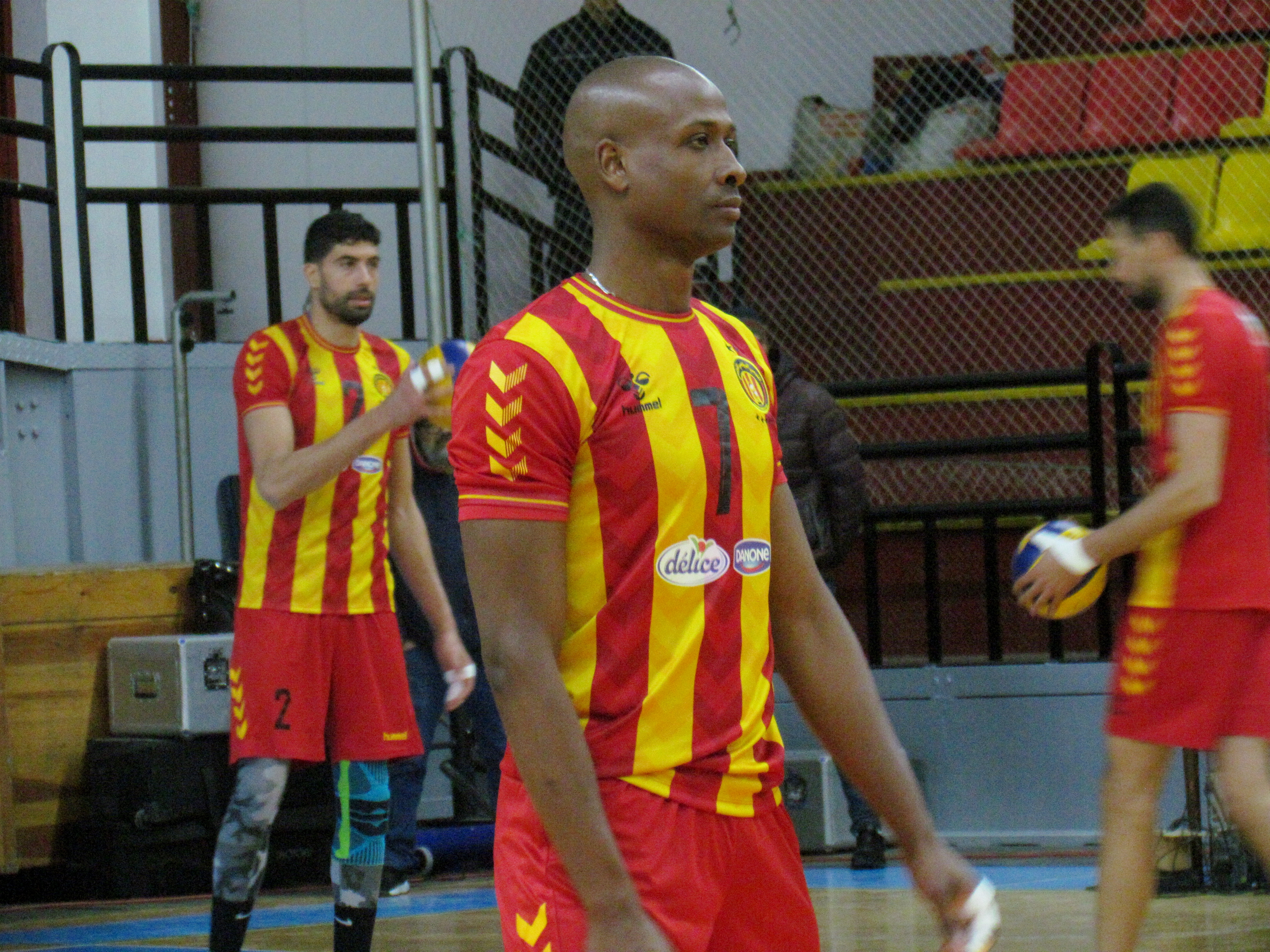
- Nagga in 2022

Personal information
- Full name: Hamza Nagga
- Nationality: Tunisia
- Born: May 29, 1990; Tunis, Tunisia
- Hometown: Tunis, Tunisia
- Height: 1.91 m (6 ft 3 in)
- Weight: 85 kg (187 lb)

Volleyball information
- Position: Opposite hitter
- Current club: (Tunisia) Ésperance sportive de Tunis
- Number: 10

National team
2010 -	Tunisia
Honours
African Championships
Bronze medal – third place	2011 Tangier	Team
Silver medal – second place	2013 Sousse	Team
Mediterranean Games
Silver medal – second place	2013 Mersin	Team
- Last updated: December 2013

Hamza Nagga (born 29 May 1990 in Tunis, Tunisia) is a Tunisian volleyball player. He is 191 cm high and plays as an opposite hitter. He was part of the Tunisian team at the 2012 and 2020 Summer Olympics.

== Clubs ==
Club	Nation	Years
Tunis Air Club	Tunisia	2009–2012
CO Kélibia (loan)	Tunisia	2010–2012
Étoile du Sahel	Tunisia	2012-
Darkulaib Club (loan)	Bahrain	February 2014

== Awards ==
=== Club ===
- 1 Tunisian League (2014)
- 1 Tunisian Cup (2011)

=== National team ===
- 1 Arab Championship (2012)
- 1 African Championship U21 (2008)
