= Héctor Soto =

Puerto Rican volleyball player

Personal information
- Full name: Héctor Emilio Soto
- Nickname: Picky
- Nationality: Puerto Rican
- Born: June 28, 1978 (age 48); New York City, New York, U.S.
- Hometown: Arroyo, Puerto Rico
- Height: 1.97 m (6 ft 6 in)
- Weight: 85 kg (187 lb)
- Spike: 340 cm (130 in)
- Block: 332 cm (131 in)

Volleyball information
- Position: Wing spiker

National team
1995–2016	Puerto Rico
Medal record
Men's volleyball
Representing Puerto Rico
NORCECA Championship
Silver medal – second place	2007 Anaheim	Team
Pan-American Cup
Bronze medal – third place	2010 San Juan	Team
Central American and Caribbean Games
Gold medal – first place	2002 San Salvador	Team
Gold medal – first place	2006 Cartagena	Team
Gold medal – first place	2010 Mayagüez	Team
Silver medal – second place	2014 Veracruz	Team
- Last updated: April 21, 2018

Héctor Soto (born June 28, 1978 in Arroyo, Puerto Rico) is a former volleyball player from Puerto Rico, who was a member of the Men's National Team that ended up in sixth place at the 2007 FIVB Men's World Cup in Japan and received the Best Scorer individual award. He played in the 2006 FIVB World Championship, being also named Best Scorer of the tournament.

== College ==
Soto is married with Amnerys González and has two children, Camila and Maurizio. He studied in the Carmen B. Huyke High School.

== Career ==
Soto started playing professionally with the Puerto Rican club Bucaneros de Arroyo in the 1995 season, he then played with Caribes de San Sebastián since 1998 when Arroyo and San Sebastian merged, winning the 1999 Puerto Rican League Championship with this team and becoming Final Series Most Valuable Player. He later played the 2000/01 season in the Tunisian League with the club Club Sportif Sfaxien. He won the silver medal in the 2001 African Volleyball Clubs Champions Championship when his club lost 0-3 to the compatriot Étoile du Sahel. His team lost to Étoile Sportive du Sahel Volleyball Club the Tunisian League Super Playoff and the Tunisian Cup.

In 1995 Soto debuted with the Senior National Team. After being played for the Puerto Rican club Caribes de San Sebastián for the 2001 season, Soto signed with the Belgian club Noliko Maaseik. With this club, Soto played the 2001–02 CEV Champions League, reaching only the quarterfinals and the semifinals in the Belgian League. He then played with Caribes de San Sebastián topping the regular season scoring department with 550 points.

Soto played with the Italian club Cagliari Volley from 2002 to 2006, winning the A-2 Championship in the 2004/05 season, the club was promoted to Serie A-1 the following season. He was awarded ASES Puerto Rican Best Male Athlete for the 2006 year.

Soto played the 2003 Pan American Games in Santo Domingo, Dominican Republic were his national team ended up in seventh place of eight teams with a 1-5 mark.

The Puerto Rican club Playeros de San Juan signed Soto for the 2005 season and he also played there until the 2006 season.

At 2006 FIVB World Championship in Japan, he became the Best Scorer of the tournament and helped his National Team to reach the 12th place. He ended playing for the Panasonic Panthers in the Japanese League in the 2006/2007 season.

He was selected as flag bearer for Puerto Rico in the 2007 edition in Rio de Janeiro, when he was the tournament's Best Scorer and helped his team reach the fifth place. Soto is nicknamed "Picky". Serving as the team captain Soto was named the tournament's Best Scorer at the 2007 NORCECA Championship, finishing with 104 points on 94 spikes, five blocks and five aces.

On June 25, 2008, Soto announced that he would take part in a promotional campaign for Gatorade.

Soto played the 2007–08 and the 2008–09 Russian Super League with Lokomotiv Novosibirsk.

Soto signed with the Turkish league champion club based in Izmir, Arkas Spor for the 2009/10 season with the hunger of winning a championship. After winning the bronze medal in the 2009 NORCECA Championship, Soto was meant to report himself to Arkas and was notified to the Puerto Rican Federation to do it and received legal support by the local lawyer Fernando Olivero in the dispute with the club. He later commented that he had to stay in Puerto Rico in order to help both his father and one of his brother that were ill at that time and that he felt exhausted after the continental championship.

Soto joined the Puerto Rican club Mets de Guaynabo for the 2010 season. He won with his team the Bronze medal at the 2010 Pan-American Cup. He suffered an injury during the Pan American Cup and could not play until the playoffs. He was not able to play the 2011 season because he went under surgery to repair an injury in his right shoulder.

Coming from a shoulder injury, Soto joined the Puerto Rican club Capitanes de Arecibo for the 2012/13 season after his contract was sold by Mets de Guaynabo and was selected for the All-Star game. But he suffered an injury during the match and was replaced by Erick Haddock. He recovered to lead his team in scoring and being third in the league during the regular season. And later in January 2013, helped his club to win the Puerto Rican league championship.

Instead of rejoining his champion club, Soto announced that he would switch to beach volleyball. He played the 2013/14 Puerto Rican league season with Arecibo and was chosen to play the 2013/14 season All-Star game. He helped his club to reach the final series, but they lost to Mets de Guaynabo the local Championship.

He played the 2014 FIVB World Championship in Poland, reaching the 21st place after posting a 1–4 record in the pool play with his National Team. Soto then played the Puerto Rican league, breaking the current scoring record of 5,151 set by compatriot Luis Rodríguez, setting himself the goal of reaching 6,000 points.

He later won the 2014 Season of the Puerto Rican League Championship with Capitanes de Arecibo, leading his team with 16 points in the final match and securing a berth for the 2015 FIVB Club World Championship.

He participated with his national team in the 2015 Pan American Games, were his team succeeded to reach the semifinals for the first time but lost the medal hopes after losing to Brazil in the semifinals and Canada in the Bronze Medal match. At the 2015 FIVB Club World Championship held in Betim, Brazil, Soto's club participated as NORCECA representative and he served as team captain. His club lost 0-3 to Brazilian Sada Cruzeiro and also 0-3 to the Russian Zenit Kazan to end its participation in tied fifth place. Soto then played with Capitanes de Arecibo in the Puerto Rican league, helping his club to claim the third place after falling to the later Champions Mets de Guaynabo in the semifinals, when he could not play because of a heel injury.

Soto played the 2014–2016 NORCECA Beach Volleyball Continental Cup trying to secure a ticket to the 2016 Summer Olympics in what he defined a last minute decision to close up his career, but his team fell short losing to Cuba in the semifinal round.

He was acquired via draft by the Puerto Rican club Mets de Guaynabo, that was about not to play the 2016/17 season and do not play the pre-season tournament, Soto arrived to a club that decided not to include any foreign player. The club won the Puerto Rican Championship for the second straight season.

=== College ===
Attended Indiana University – Ft. Wayne, where he was a two time AVCA Division I First Team All-American (1999, 2000) and a Second Team All-American selection in 1998.

== Clubs ==
- (Puerto Rico) Bucaneros de Arroyo (1995-1998)
- (Puerto Rico) Caribes de San Sebastián (1998-2002)
- (Tunisia) Club Sportif Sfaxien (2000-2001)
- (Belgium) Noliko Maaseik (2001–2002)
- (Italy) Alimenti Sardi Cagliari (2002–2003)
- (Italy) Terra Sarda Cagliari (2003–2005)
- (Italy) Tiscali Cagliari (2005–2006)
- (Puerto Rico) Playeros de San Juan (2005–2006)
- (Japan) Panasonic Panthers (2006–2007)
- (Russia) Lokomotiv Novosibirsk (2007–2009)
- (Turkey) Arkas Spor Izmir (2009–2010)
- (South Korea) Hyundai Capital Skywalkers (2010–2011)
- (Puerto Rico) Mets de Guaynabo (2010–2012)
- (Puerto Rico) Capitanes de Arecibo (2012–2015)
- (Puerto Rico) Mets de Guaynabo (2016–2017)

== Awards ==
=== Clubs ===
- 1999 Puerto Rican League – Champion, with Caribes de San Sebastián
- 2000-01 Tunisian Cup – Runner-Up, with Club Sportif Sfaxien
- 2000-01 Tunisian League – Runner-Up, with Club Sportif Sfaxien
- 2001 African Volleyball Clubs Champions Championship – Runner-Up, with Club Sportif Sfaxien
- 2002 Belgium League – Champion, with Noliko Maaseik
- 2002 Belgium Cup – Champion, with Noliko Maaseik
- 2004-05 Italian A2 Championship Champion – Champion, with Terra Sarda Cagliari
- 2010-11 Korean V-League – Bronze medal, with Hyundai Capital Skywalkers
- 2012-13 Puerto Rican League – Champion, with Capitanes de Arecibo
- 2013-14 Puerto Rican League – Runner-Up, with Capitanes de Arecibo
- 2014 Puerto Rican League – Champion, with Capitanes de Arecibo
- 2015 Puerto Rican League – Bronze medal, with Capitanes de Arecibo
- 2016-17 Puerto Rican League – Champion, with Mets de Guaynabo

Awards
Preceded by (Argentina) Marcos Milinkovic	2006 Men's Volleyball World Championship; Best Scorer; 2006	Succeeded by Incumbent
Preceded by (Japan) Takahiro Yamamoto	2007 Men's Volleyball World Cup; Best Scorer; 2007	Succeeded by Incumbent
