= Noureddine Hfaiedh =

Tunisian volleyball player and coach

Medal record

Representing Tunisia

African Championships
Silver medal – second place	1993 Algiers	Team
Gold medal – first place	1995 Tunis	Team
Gold medal – first place	1997 Lagos	Team
Gold medal – first place	1999 Cairo	Team
Gold medal – first place	2003 Cairo	Team
Silver medal – second place	2007 Durban	Team
Bronze medal – third place	2011 Tangier	Team
Silver medal – second place	2013 Sousse	Team

Mediterranean Games
Silver medal – second place	2001 Tunis	Team

Noureddine Hfaiedh (born August 27, 1973 in Jendouba) is a Tunisian volleyball player and a coach. He is 197 cm high and plays as wing spiker.

Hfaiedh has played more than 160 games with the Tunisia men's national volleyball team and is the current captain of the team. He has participated in the Summer Olympics for Tunisia in 1996, 2004, and 2012.

== Clubs ==
Club	Country	From	To
AS Haouaria	Tunisia	1985–1986	1992–1993
CS Sfaxien	Tunisia	1993	1994
ES Sahel	Tunisia	1994–1995	2001–2002
P.A.O.K. Thessaloniki	Greece	2002–2003	2003–2004
Paris Volley	France	2004	2005
Tours Volley-Ball	France	2005	2006
NEC Blue Rockets	Japan	2006	2007
Qadsia SC	Kuwait	2007–2008	2009–2010
ES Sahel	Tunisia	2010–2011	2011–2012
CS Sfaxien	Tunisia	2012–2013	2013-2014

== Awards ==
=== Club ===
- 3 African Champions League (2001, 2002, 2013)
- 1 African Cup Winners' Cup (2001)
- 1 French Cup (2006)
- 1 Japanese Cup (2007)
- 2 Arab Clubs Championship (1995, 2013)
- 7 Tunisian League (1995, 2000, 2001, 2002, 2011, 2012, 2013)
- 4 Tunisian Cup (1995, 1998, 2001, 2013)

=== National team ===
- 4 African Championship (1995, 1997, 2001, 2003)
- 2 Arab Championship (1996, 2002)
- 1 Pan Arab Games (1999)

=== As a Coach ===
- 2 Tunisian Volleyball Cup (2015, 2016)

== Individual awards ==
- 2003 Men's African Championship "Most Valuable Player"
- 2003 Men's African Championship "Best Scorer"
- 2007 Japanese Cup "Best Wing Spiker"
- 2013 Arab Clubs Champions Championship "Best Spiker"
- 2013 African Champions League "Most Valuable Player"
- 2013 African Championship "Best Receiver"
