= Club Africain (men's volleyball) =

Tunisian volleyball club

Club Africain Volleyball
- Full name: Club Africain
- Short name: CA, Al Ifriqi
- Nickname: El Ghalia, El hamra
- Founded: 1943
- Dissolved: 2001
- Ground: Salle Chérif-Bellamine, Tunis (Capacity: 1,500)
- League: Tunisian Volleyball League
- Website: Club home page

Uniforms
Home	Away

The Club Africain Men's Volleyball Club (Arabic: النادي الافريقي للكرة الطائرة, English: African Club or CA) was a volleyball team based in the Tunisian capital Tunis which was part of the omnisport Club Africain. Founded in 1943, it competed in the Tunisian Men's Volleyball Leagues.

Due to economic issues, the team was dissolved in 2001.

== Honours ==
=== National titles ===
- Tunisian Volleyball League 7 :

Champions : 1980–81, 1982–83, 1988–89, 1989–90, 1990–91, 1991–92, 1993–94
Vice Champion : 1981–82, 1983–84, 1986–87, 1992–93, 1995–96,

- Tunisian Volleyball Cup 5 :

Champions : 1982–83, 1983–84, 1989–90, 1990–91, 1991–92
Runners Up : 1977–78, 1981–82

=== International titles ===
- African Champions Cup 3 :

Champions : 1991, 1992, 1993

- African Cup Winners' Cup 1 :

Champions : 1992
Runners Up : 1991
Bronze medal : 1993

- FIVB Club World Championship

Best Performance 7th Place : 1991, 1992

=== Regional Titles ===
- Arab Clubs Championship 2 :

Champions : 1992, 1994
Runners Up : 1995

== Last Squad 2001 ==
Club Africain Volleyball roster
Players List: 0? (Tunisia); 0? (Tunisia); 0? (Tunisia); 0? (Tunisia); 0? (Tunisia); 0? (Tunisia); 0? (Tunisia); 0? (Tunisia); 0? (Tunisia); 0? (Tunisia); 0? (Tunisia); 0? (Tunisia)	Technical staff: Head coach : (Tunisia); Assistant coach : (Tunisia); Club doctor : (Tunisia)

== See also ==
- Club Africain (football)
- Club Africain (basketball)
- Club Africain (handball)
- Club Africain Women's Handball
- Club Africain Women's Volleyball
