= Tunisian Men's Volleyball Super Cup =

- Current season, competition or edition: 2021–22 Tunisian Men's Volleyball Super Cup
- Sport: Volleyball
- Founded: 2003; 23 years ago
- No. of teams: 2
- Country: Tunisia
- Continent: Africa (CAVB)
- Most recent champions: Espérance de Tunis (2023)
- Most titles: Espérance de Tunis (8 titles)
- Level on pyramid: 1
- Website: ftvb.org

The Tunisian Men's Volleyball Super Cup began with 2002–03 season. It is organized by Tunisian Volleyball Federation. Clubs of all divisions takes part in this competition.

== Titles ==
Season	Winner	Score	Finalist	The sets	Place
2002–03	Saydia Sports	3 – 2	CO Kélibia		El Menzah
2003–04	cancelled				
2004–05	Club Sfaxien	3 – 1	CO Kélibia		Sfax
2005–06	cancelled				
2006–07	Étoile du Sahel	3 – 1	Espérance de Tunis		El Menzah
2007–08	Espérance de Tunis	3 – 0	CO Kélibia		Sidi Bou Said
2008–09	Espérance de Tunis	3 – 1	Étoile du Sahel		La Goulette
2009–10	Étoile du Sahel	3 – 1	Club Sfaxien		Sidi Bou Said
2010–11	cancelled				
2011–12	cancelled				
2012–13	cancelled				
2013–14	cancelled				
2014–15	cancelled				
2015–16	cancelled				
2016–17	Étoile du Sahel	3 – 1	Espérance de Tunis		Radès
2017–18	Espérance de Tunis	3 – 1	Club Sfaxien		Radès
2018–19	Espérance de Tunis	3 – 1	Étoile du Sahel		Kelibia
2019–20	Espérance de Tunis	forfait	Club Sfaxien		Radès
2020–21	Espérance de Tunis	forfait	Club Sfaxien		Radès
2021–22	Espérance de Tunis	3 – 1	Club Sfaxien		La Goulette
2022–23	Espérance de Tunis	3 – 0	Étoile du Sahel		Radès

=== Performance by club ===
Rk	Club	Cups	Season
1	Espérance de Tunis	8	2008, 2009, 2018, 2019, 2020, 2021, 2022, 2023
2	Étoile du Sahel	3	2007, 2010, 2017
3	Club Sfaxien	1	2005
3	Saydia Sports	1	2003

== See also ==
- Tunisian Women's Volleyball Super Cup
