= Mouloudia Sport de Bousalem =

Tunisian volleyball club

- Full name: Mouldia Sport de Bousalem
- Short name: MSB
- Founded: 1988
- Ground: Bou Salem Hall, Bou Salem
- Chairman: (Tunisia) Mosbah Mahmoudi
- Manager: (Tunisia) Haithem Weslati
- League: Tunisian Volleyball League
- 2022–23: 5th Place

Uniforms
Home	Away

Mouldia Sport de Bousalem (Arabic: المولدية الرياضية ببوسالم, often referred to as MSB) is a Tunisian volleyball club that was founded since 1988 in Bou Salem, Jendouba Governorate and Currently they Play in Tunisian Volleyball 1st Division. The team won the African Club Championship in 2023 from the first participation.

== History ==
The club was initially the volleyball department of the sports club Union Sportive Bousalem, founded in 1924.

In 2023, after qualifying for the African Clubs Championship for the first time in club history, they won the competition and beat well-known opponents en route to the final. In the final they defeated top Egyptian club Zamalek SC 3–2. After two sets they were 0–2 behind, but still turned the endgame in their favor. The club qualified for the Volleyball Club World Championship in india. On 24 May 2023, the President of the Republic, Kais Saied and the Minister of Sports, Kamel Deguiche, received the club's members at the Presidential Palace of Carthage.

== Honours ==
=== National Achievements ===
- Tunisian Federation Cup :

Winners (2) : 2023, 2025
Runners up (1) : 2022

- Tunisian 2nd National League :

Winners (1) : 2015

=== International Achievements ===
- African Clubs Championship :

Winners (1) : 2023
Runners up (1) : 2024
