= AS Marsa (men's volleyball) =

Tunisian volleyball club

AS Marsa Volleyball Club
- Full name: Avenir sportif de La Marsa
- Short name: ASM
- Nickname: El Gnawia
- Founded: 1944
- Ground: Salle Marsa, La Marsa, Tunis (Capacity: 1,000)
- League: Tunisian Volleyball League
- 2022–23: 6th Place
- Website: Club home page

Uniforms
Home	Away

Avenir sportif de La Marsa Volleyball Club (Arabic: نادي المستقبل الرياضي بالمرسي للكرة الطائرة, English: El Marsa Future Association Club or ASM) is a Tunisian men's Volleyball team based in La Marsa, Tunis Town and is one of AS Marsa men's main Section, Since the year 1944 and it is currently playing in the Tunisian Men's Volleyball League Top Division, The Club have a huge success they won the Tunisian Championship in 7 occasions and also they have won the Tunisian Volleyball Cup crown 8 times, 4 of them are consecutive.

== Honours ==
=== National titles ===
- Tunisian Volleyball League 7 :

Champions : 1961–62, 1962–63, 1969–70, 1970–71, 1972–73, 1974–75, 1979–80
Vice Champion :

- Tunisian Volleyball Cup 8 :

Champions : 1961–62, 1962–63, 1967–68, 1968–69, 1969–70, 1970–71, 1972–73, 1987–88
Runners Up : 1963–64, 1979–80, 1980–81, 1988–89, 2022–23

== Current squad 2022–23 ==
AS Marsa Volleyball roster
Players List: 01 (Tunisia); 02 (Tunisia); 03 (Tunisia); 04 (Tunisia); 05 (Tunisia); 06 (Tunisia); 07 (Tunisia); 08 (Tunisia); 09 (Tunisia); 10 (Tunisia); 11 (Tunisia); 12 (Tunisia)	Technical staff: Head coach : (Tunisia); Assistant coach : (Tunisia); Club doctor : (Tunisia)

== Head coaches ==
This is a list of the senior team's head coaches in the recent years.

Dates	Name
→	
→	
→	
→	
→	
→	

As of 2018

== See also ==
- AS Marsa
- AS Marsa Women's Volleyball
