= African Volleyball Cup Winners' Cup =

International volleyball competition

- Sport: Volleyball
- Founded: 1989
- Country: CAVB members
- Continent: Africa
- Most titles: (Egypt) Al Ahly SC (6 titles)
- Website: CAVB.org

The Africa Volleyball Championship for Clubs Winner's Cup was an annual international club volleyball competition run by the African Volleyball Confederation. The cup winners from Africa's national volleyball leagues were invited to participate in this competition.

== Summary ==
Year	Host	Champion	Runner up	Third place
1989	(Tunisia) La Marsa	(Cameroon) AES Sonel	(Egypt) Zamalek SC	(Egypt) Al Ahly SC
1990	(Egypt) Cairo	(Egypt) Al Ahly SC	(Egypt) Zamalek SC	(Tunisia) CO Kelibia
1991	(Algeria) Blida	(Egypt) Al Ahly SC	(Tunisia) Club Africain VB	(Egypt) Zamalek SC
1992	(Morocco) Meknès	(Tunisia) Club Africain VB	(Algeria) USM Blida	(Tunisia) CO Kelibia
1993	(Egypt) Cairo	(Egypt) Arab Contractors SC	(Egypt) Zamalek SC	(Tunisia) Club Africain
1994	(Tunisia) Tunis	(Algeria) Olympique de Médéa	(Tunisia) Espérance de Tunis	(Tunisia) US transports de Sfax
1995	(Egypt) Cairo	(Egypt) Al Ahly SC	(Egypt) Zamalek SC	(Tunisia) Etoile du Sahel
1996	(South Africa) Durban	(Egypt) Al Ahly SC	(Egypt) Zamalek SC	(Nigeria) Kano Super stars
1997	(Egypt) Cairo	(Egypt) Al Ahly SC	(Algeria) USM Blida	(Egypt) Zamalek SC
1998	Not Held			
1999	Not Held			
2000	(Ethiopia) Addis-Abeba	(Egypt) Al Ahly SC	(Egypt) Zamalek SC	(Ethiopia) Mogaize
2001	(Egypt) Cairo	(Tunisia) Etoile du Sahel	(Egypt) Al Ahly SC	(Cameroon) Fap Yaounde
2002	(Algeria) Alger	(Algeria) USM Blida	(Tunisia) CS Sfaxien	
2003	(Algeria) Bordj Bou Arreridj	(Tunisia) Saydia Sports	(Algeria) USM Blida	(Tunisia) CS Sfaxien
2004	(Tunisia) Kélibia	(Tunisia) Saydia Sports	(Tunisia) CO Kelibia	
2005	Not Held			
2006	(Egypt) Cairo	(Egypt) Zamalek SC	(Tunisia) Etoile du Sahel	

== By club ==
Rank	Club	Winners	Runners-up	Years won
1	Al Ahly SC	6	1	1990, 1991, 1995, 1996, 1997, 2000
2	Saydia Sports	2	0	2003, 2004
3	Zamalek SC	1	6	2006
4	USM Blida	1	3	2002
5	Club Africain VB	1	1	1992
6	ES Sahel VC	1	1	2001
7	Olympique Médéa	1	0	1994
8	El Mokawloon SC	1	0	1993
9	AES Sonel	1	0	1989

^n/a A round-robin tournament determined the final standings.

== See also ==
- African Clubs Championship (volleyball)
