= Mohammed Slim Chekili =

Tunisian volleyball player (born 1985)

Mohammed Slim Chekili lhnach

Personal information
- Nationality: Tunisia
- Born: 15 March 1985 (age 41)
- Height: 1.98 m (6 ft 6 in)
- Weight: 82 kg (181 lb)
- Spike: 328 cm (129 in)
- Block: 309 cm (122 in)

Volleyball information
- Number: 17

Career
Years	Teams
2004	(Tunisia) C.O. Kelibia

National team
2004	Tunisia

Mohammed Slim Chekili (born 15 March 1985) is a former Tunisian male volleyball player. He was part of the Tunisia men's national volleyball team. He competed with the national team at the 2004 Summer Olympics in Athens, Greece. He played with C.O. Kelibia in 2004.

== Clubs ==
- (Tunisia) C.O. Kelibia (2004)

== See also ==
- Tunisia at the 2004 Summer Olympics
