= 2013 African Volleyball Clubs Champions Championship =

Tournament details
- Host country: Libya
- City: Tripoli
- Dates: 19 April 2013 – 27 April 2013
- Teams: 17 (from 1 confederation)
- Venue: 2 (in 1 host city)

Final positions
- Champions: (Tunisia) CS Sfaxien (6th title)
- Runners-up: (Tunisia) Espérance de Tunis

Tournament statistics
- Best player: Noureddine Hfaiedh

The 2013 African Volleyball Clubs Champions Championship was the 32nd edition of African's premier club volleyball tournament held in Tripoli, Libya.

== Group stage ==
The draw was held on 18 April 2013.

Pool A	Pool B	Pool C	Pool D
(Libya) Ahly Tripoli; (Sudan) Nahdha; (Cameroon) FAP Yaoundé; (Republic of the Congo) DGSP	(Algeria) NR Bordj Bou Arréridj; (Tunisia) CS Sfaxien; (Libya) Ahly Benghazi; (Burundi) Muzinga; (Sudan) Daim Hamad	(Tunisia) Espérance de Tunis; (Ethiopia) Muger Cement; (Nigeria) Delta Spikers; (Libya) Asswehly	(Kenya) Prisons; (Mozambique) Autoridade Tributaria; (Uganda) Nemostars; (Ivory Coast) Abidjan Université Club

=== Pool A ===
Pos	Team	Pld	W	L	Pts	SW	SL	SR	SPW	SPL	SPR
1	(Libya) Al-Ahly Tripoli	3	3	0	6	9	2	4.500	254	209	1.215
2	(Cameroon) FAP Yaoundé	3	2	1	5	8	3	2.667	253	212	1.193
3	(Sudan) Nahdha	3	1	2	4	3	8	0.375	205	256	0.801
4	(Republic of the Congo) DGSP	3	0	3	3	2	9	0.222	225	260	0.865

Date	Time		Score		Set 1	Set 2	Set 3	Set 4	Set 5	Total	Report
19 Apr	20:00	Ahly Tripoli (Libya)	3–0	(Sudan) Nahdha	25–16	25–14	25–18			75–48	
20 Apr	12:00	FAP Yaoundé (Cameroon)	3–0	(Republic of the Congo) DGSP	25–20	25–21	25–20			75–61	
21 Apr	17:00	FAP Yaoundé (Cameroon)	3–0	(Sudan) Nahdha	25–20	25–13	25–14			75–47	
21 Apr	20:00	Ahly Tripoli (Libya)	3–0	(Republic of the Congo) DGSP	25–16	25–23	25–19			75–58	
22 Apr	15:00	DGSP (Republic of the Congo)	2–3	(Sudan) Nahdha	25–21	25–23	22–25	24–26	10-15	106–95	
23 Apr	20:00	Ahly Tripoli (Libya)	3–2	(Cameroon) FAP Yaoundé	25–21	19–25	20–25	25–20	15-12	104–91	

=== Pool B ===
Pos	Team	Pld	W	L	Pts	SW	SL	SR	SPW	SPL	SPR
1	(Tunisia) CS Sfaxien	4	4	0	8	12	0	MAX	300	190	1.579
2	(Libya) Ahly Benghazi	4	3	1	7	9	4	2.250	298	251	1.187
3	(Algeria) NR Bordj Bou Arréridj	4	2	2	6	7	6	1.167	291	268	1.086
4	(Burundi) Muzinga	4	1	3	5	3	10	0.300	228	313	0.728
5	(Sudan) Daim Hamad	4	0	4	4	1	12	0.083	226	321	0.704

Date	Time		Score		Set 1	Set 2	Set 3	Set 4	Set 5	Total	Report
19 Apr	14:00	CS Sfaxien (Tunisia)	3–0	(Burundi) Muzinga	25–13	25–14	25–09			75–36	
19 Apr	16:00	NR Bordj Bou Arréridj (Algeria)	3–0	(Sudan) Daim Hamad	25–16	25–17	25–14			75–47	
20 Apr	16:00	NR Bordj Bou Arréridj (Algeria)	3–0	(Burundi) Muznga	25–14	25–13	25–23			75–50	
20 Apr	18:00	Ahly Benghazi (Libya)	3–0	(Sudan) Daim Hamad	25–15	25–21	25–22			75–58	
21 Apr	13:00	Daim Hamad (Sudan)	1–3	(Burundi) Muzinga	20–25	25–19	25–27	18–25	-	88–96	
21 Apr	18:00	CS Sfaxien (Tunisia)	3–0	(Libya) Ahly Benghazi	25–19	25–20	25–13			75–52	
22 Apr	17:00	Daim Hamad (Sudan)	0–3	(Tunisia) CS Sfaxien	16–25	13–25	14–25		-	43–75	
22 Apr	20:00	NR Bordj Bou Arréridj (Algeria)	1–3	(Libya) Ahly Benghazi	25–27	15–25	25–19	17-25	-	82–71	
23 Apr	16:00	Ahly Benghazi (Libya)	3–0	(Burundi) Muzinga	25–17	25–15	25–14			75–46	
23 Apr	18:00	CS Sfaxien (Tunisia)	3–0	(Algeria) NR Bordj Bou Arréridj	25–22	25–17	25–20			75–59	

=== Pool C ===
Pos	Team	Pld	W	L	Pts	SW	SL	SR	SPW	SPL	SPR
1	(Tunisia) Espérance de Tunis	3	3	0	6	9	0	MAX	226	149	1.517
2	(Libya) Asswehly	3	2	1	5	6	4	1.500	236	189	1.249
3	(Nigeria) Delta Spikers	3	1	2	4	4	7	0.571	221	259	0.853
4	(Ethiopia) Muger Cement	3	0	3	3	1	9	0.111	162	248	0.653

Date	Time		Score		Set 1	Set 2	Set 3	Set 4	Set 5	Total	Report
19 Apr	10:00	Delta Spikers (Nigeria)	3–1	(Ethiopia) Muger Cement	23–25	25–23	25–18	25-21		98–66	
20 Apr	20:00	Espérance de Tunis (Tunisia)	3–0	(Libya) Asswehly	25–22	26–24	25–18			76–64	
21 Apr	15:00	Espérance de Tunis (Tunisia)	3–0	(Nigeria) Delta Spikers	25–14	25–15	25–16			75–45	
21 Apr	16:00	Asswehly (Libya)	3–0	(Ethiopia) Muger Cement	25–13	25–13	25–09			75–35	
22 Apr	18:00	Asswehly (Libya)	3–1	(Nigeria) Delta Spikers	22–25	25–15	25–22	25–16		97–78	
23 Apr	17:00	Espérance de Tunis (Tunisia)	3–0	(Ethiopia) Muger Cement	25–14	25–14	25–12			75–40	

=== Pool D ===
Pos	Team	Pld	W	L	Pts	SW	SL	SR	SPW	SPL	SPR
1	(Kenya) Prisons	3	3	0	6	9	2	4.500	256	195	1.313
2	(Mozambique) Autoridade Tributaria	3	2	1	5	8	3	2.667	242	242	1.000
3	(Uganda) Nemostars	3	1	2	4	3	8	0.375	298	285	1.046
4	(Ivory Coast) Abidjan Université Club	3	0	3	3	2	9	0.222	240	288	0.833

Date	Time		Score		Set 1	Set 2	Set 3	Set 4	Set 5	Total	Report
19 Apr	12:00	Prisons (Kenya)	3–1	(Uganda) Nemostars	25–19	25–17	30–32	25-20		105–68	
20 Apr	14:00	Autoridade Tributaria (Mozambique)	3–1	(Ivory Coast) Abidjan Université Club	25–21	25–20	22–25	25-17		97–66	
21 Apr	11:00	Abidjan Université Club (Ivory Coast)	2–3	(Uganda) Nemostars	13–25	27–25	24–26	26-24	08-15	98–76	
21 Apr	14:00	Prisons (Kenya)	3–0	(Mozambique) Autoridade Tributaria	25–16	25–20	25–14			75–50	
22 Apr	16:00	Nemostars (Uganda)	1–3	(Mozambique) Autoridade Tributaria	21–25	25–20	18–25	18–25		82–95	
23 Apr	15:00	Prisons (Kenya)	3–0	(Ivory Coast) Abidjan Université Club	25–18	26–24	25–15			76–57	

== Knockout stage ==
Quarter-finals
24 April, 25–20 25–21 28–26
(Kenya) Prisons	3
(Cameroon) FAP Yaoundé	0
24 April, 25–20 25–21 28–26
(Tunisia) CS Sfaxien	3
(Libya) Asswehly	0
24 April, 18–25 21–25 24–26
(Libya) Ahly Benghazi	0
(Tunisia) Espérance de Tunis	3
24 April, 25–21 25–19 25–23
(Libya) Ahly Tripoli	3
(Mozambique) Autoridade Tributaria	0

Semi-finals
25 April, 25–21 25–13 25–15
(Tunisia) CS Sfaxien	3
(Kenya) Prisons	0
25 April, 17–25 25–23 15–25 14-25
(Libya) Ahly Tripoli	1
(Tunisia) Espérance de Tunis	3

Final
27 April, 23-25 25-22 25-15 27-29 15-12
(Tunisia) CS Sfaxien	3
(Tunisia) Espérance de Tunis	2
Third place
27 April, 25-17 26-24 25-16
(Libya) Ahly Tripoli	3
(Kenya) Prisons	0

=== Quarterfinals ===
Date	Time		Score		Set 1	Set 2	Set 3	Set 4	Set 5	Total	Report
24 Apr	16:00	Prisons (Kenya)	3–0	(Cameroon) FAP Yaoundé	25–20	25–21	28–26			78–67	
24 Apr	18:00	Asswehly (Libya)	2–3	(Tunisia) CS Sfaxien	14–25	28–30	18–25			60–80	
24 Apr	19:00	Ahly Tripoli (Libya)	3–0	(Mozambique) Autoridade Tributaria	25–18	25–18	25–15			75–51	
24 Apr	20:00	Espérance de Tunis (Tunisia)	3–0	(Libya) Ahly Benghazi	25–18	25–21	26–24			76–63	

=== Semifinals ===
Date	Time		Score		Set 1	Set 2	Set 3	Set 4	Set 5	Total	Report
25 Apr	18:00	CS Sfaxien (Tunisia)	3–0	(Kenya) Prisons	25–21	25–13	25–15			75–49	
25 Apr	20:00	Ahly Tripoli (Libya)	1–3	(Tunisia) Espérance de Tunis	17–25	25–23	15–25	14-25		71–73	

=== Bronze medal match ===
Date	Time		Score		Set 1	Set 2	Set 3	Set 4	Set 5	Total	Report
27 Apr	16:00	Ahly Tripoli (Libya)	3–0	(Kenya) Prisons	25–17	26–24	25–16			76–57	

=== Final ===
Date	Time		Score		Set 1	Set 2	Set 3	Set 4	Set 5	Total	Report
27 Apr	18:00	CS Sfaxien (Tunisia)	3–2	(Tunisia) Espérance de Tunis	23–25	25–22	25–15	27-29	15-12	115–62	

== Final standing ==
Rank	Team
1st place, gold medalist(s)	(Tunisia) CS Sfaxien
2nd place, silver medalist(s)	(Tunisia) Espérance de Tunis
3rd place, bronze medalist(s)	(Libya) Ahly Tripoli
4	(Kenya) Prisons
5	(Cameroon) FAP Yaoundé
6	(Libya) Ahly Benghazi
7	(Libya) Asswehly
8	(Mozambique) Autoridade Tributaria
9	(Algeria) NR Bordj Bou Arréridj
10	(Nigeria) Delta Spikers
11	(Uganda) Nemostars
12	(Sudan) Nahdha
13	(Burundi) Muzinga
14	(Republic of the Congo) DGSP
15	(Ethiopia) Muger Cement
16	(Ivory Coast) Abidjan Université Club
17	(Sudan) Daim Hamad

Qualified for the 2013 Club World Championship

=== Awards ===
- MVP: (Tunisia) Noureddine Hfaiedh (CS Sfaxien)
- Best blocker: (Libya) Mohamed Salama (Ahly Benghazi)
- Best libero: (Tunisia) Anouer Taouerghi (CS Sfaxien)
- Best receiver: (Egypt) Saleh Fathi (Espérance de Tunis)
- Best server: (Kenya) Daniel (Prisons)
- Best setter: (Tunisia) Mehdi Ben Cheikh (Espérance de Tunis)
- Best spiker: (Libya) Fouad Elmaaroug (Ahly Tripoli)

Source: cavb.org, 27.04.2013
