= 2013 Arab Volleyball Clubs Champions Championship =

Tournament details
- Host country: Lebanon
- City: Beirut
- Dates: 3 February 2013 – 10 February 2013
- Teams: 13 (from 2 confederations)
- Venues: 2 (in 1 host city)

Final positions
- Champions: (Tunisia) CS Sfaxien (7th title)
- Runners-up: (Lebanon) Club Jeunesse Bauchrieh

The 2013 Arab Clubs Championship was the 31st edition of the Arab Clubs Championship for volleyball tournament. It was held in Beirut, Lebanon. Thirteen teams from Egypt, Iraq, Kuwait, Lebanon, Libya, Morocco, Oman, and Tunisia competed in 4 stages, with CS Sfaxien winning the championship.

== Group stage ==
The draw was held on 12 January 2013.

Pool A	Pool B	Pool C	Pool D
(Iraq) Nadi Al Peshmerga; (Oman) Assib; (Libya) Al-Ahly Tripoli	(Oman) Saham Club; (Lebanon) Club Jeunesse Bauchrieh; (Libya) Asswehly S.C.	(Morocco) FAR Rabat; (Egypt) Al Ahly SC; (Kuwait) Kazma Sporting Club	(Kuwait) Al-Arabi SC; (Tunisia) CS Sfaxien; (Iraq) Ghaz Al-Janoob; (Lebanon) Al Anwar Al Jadida

=== Pool A ===
Pos	Team	Pld	W	L	Pts	SW	SL	SR	SPW	SPL	SPR	Qualification
1	(Libya) Al-Ahly Tripoli	2	2	0	6	6	1	6.000	173	147	1.177	Quarterfinals
2	(Oman) Assib	2	1	1	2	3	5	0.600	170	186	0.914	Quarterfinals
3	Kuwait SC	2	0	2	1	3	6	0.500	202	212	0.953	

Date	Time		Score		Set 1	Set 2	Set 3	Set 4	Set 5	Total	Report
3 Feb	14:00	Al-Ahly Tripoli (Libya)	3–0	(Oman) Assib	25–20	25–18	25–18			75–56	
4 Feb	14:00	Assib (Oman)	3–2	(Iraq) Nadi Al Peshmerga	19–25	25–19	23–25	32–30	15–12	114–111	
5 Feb	14:00	Al-Ahly Tripoli (Libya)	3–1	(Iraq) Nadi Al Peshmerga	26–24	22–25	25–21	25–21		98–91	

=== Pool B ===
Pos	Team	Pld	W	L	Pts	SW	SL	SR	SPW	SPL	SPR	Qualification
1	(Oman) Saham Club	2	2	0	6	6	1	6.000	207	200	1.035	Quarterfinals
2	(Lebanon) CJ Bauchrieh	2	1	1	3	3	4	0.750	210	205	1.024	Quarterfinals
3	(Libya) Asswehly S.C.	2	0	2	0	2	6	0.333	189	201	0.940	

Date	Time		Score		Set 1	Set 2	Set 3	Set 4	Set 5	Total	Report
3 Feb	16:00	Saham Club (Oman)	3–0	(Lebanon) CJ Bauchrieh	21–25	26–24	25–22	20–25	15–13	107–109	
4 Feb	14:00	Asswehly S.C. (Libya)	1–3	(Oman) Saham Club	22–25	25–20	28–30	16–25		91–100	
5 Feb	18:00	CJ Bauchrieh (Lebanon)	3–1	(Libya) Asswehly S.C.	27–25	28–26	21–25	25–22		101–98	

=== Pool C ===
Pos	Team	Pld	W	L	Pts	SW	SL	SR	SPW	SPL	SPR	Qualification
1	(Egypt) Al Ahly SC	2	2	0	5	6	2	3.000	185	148	1.250	Quarterfinals
2	(Kuwait) Kazma Sporting Club	2	1	1	4	5	4	1.250	187	196	0.954	Quarterfinals
3	(Morocco) FAR Rabat	2	0	2	0	1	6	0.167	138	166	0.831	

Date	Time		Score		Set 1	Set 2	Set 3	Set 4	Set 5	Total	Report
3 Feb	16:00	Al Ahly SC (Egypt)	3–2	(Kuwait) Kazma Sporting Club	25–20	25–19	22–25	23–25	15–7	110–96	
4 Feb	16:00	FAR Rabat (Morocco)	0–3	(Egypt) Al Ahly SC	16–25	14–25	22–25			52–75	
5 Feb	16:00	Kazma Sporting Club (Kuwait)	3–1	(Morocco) FAR Rabat	25–22	16–25	25–16	25–23		91–86	

=== Pool D ===
Pos	Team	Pld	W	L	Pts	SW	SL	SR	SPW	SPL	SPR	Qualification
1	(Iraq) Ghaz Al-Janoob	3	2	1	5	7	6	1.167	284	284	1.000	Quarterfinals
2	(Tunisia) CS Sfaxien	3	2	1	5	6	6	1.000	284	265	1.072	Quarterfinals
3	(Kuwait) Al-Arabi SC	3	1	2	5	7	7	1.000	311	315	0.987	
4	(Lebanon) Al Anwar Al Jadida	3	1	2	3	5	6	0.833	251	266	0.944	

Date	Time		Score		Set 1	Set 2	Set 3	Set 4	Set 5	Total	Report
3 Feb	13:00	CS Sfaxien (Tunisia)	3–1	(Iraq) Ghaz Al-Janoob	25–20	21–25	25–11	25–20		96–76	
3 Feb	18:00	Al Anwar Al Jadida (Lebanon)	1–3	(Kuwait) Al-Arabi SC	22–25	21–25	25–22	20–25		88–97	
4 Feb	16:00	CS Sfaxien (Tunisia)	3–2	(Kuwait) Al-Arabi SC	25–20	25–20	25–27	22–25	24–22	121–114	
4 Feb	18:00	Al Anwar Al Jadida (Lebanon)	1–3	(Iraq) Ghaz Al-Janoob	25–20	30–32	11–25	22–25		88–102	
5 Feb	16:00	Ghaz Al-Janoob (Iraq)	3–2	(Kuwait) Al-Arabi SC	21–25	25–23	20–25	25–15	15–12	106–100	
5 Feb	20:00	CS Sfaxien (Tunisia)	0–3	(Lebanon) Al Anwar Al Jadida	23–25	21–25	23–25			67–75	

== Knockout stage ==
Quarter-finals
7 February, 25–18 25–20 25–17
(Tunisia) CS Sfaxien"	3
(Oman) Saham Club	0
7 February,
(Libya) Al-Ahly SC	2
(Kuwait) Kazma Sporting Club	3
7 February, 25–17 25–18 25–14
(Egypt) Al Ahly SC	3
(Oman) Assib	0
7 February, 25–21 25–19 25–23
(Lebanon) CJ Bauchrieh	3
(Iraq) Ghaz Al-Janoob	0

Semi-finals
8 February, 21–25 25–23 24–25 (Ahly withdraw)
(Lebanon) CJ Bauchrieh	1
(Egypt) Al Ahly SC	1
8 February, 25–17 25–21 25–14
(Tunisia) CS Sfaxien"	3
(Kuwait) Kazma Sporting Club	0

Final
10 February, 25–20 25–21 25–18
(Tunisia) CS Sfaxien	3
(Lebanon) CJ Bauchrieh	0
Third place
10 February, Ahly withdraw
(Kuwait) Kazma Sporting Club
(Egypt) Al Ahly SC

=== Quarterfinals ===
Date	Time		Score		Set 1	Set 2	Set 3	Set 4	Set 5	Total	Report
7 Feb	11:00	CS Sfaxien (Tunisia)	3–0	(Oman) Saham Club	25–18	25–20	25–17			75–55	
7 Feb	13:00	Al-Ahly SC (Libya)	2–3	(Kuwait) Kazma Sporting Club	30–28	25–22	21–25	17–25	11–15	104–115	
7 Feb	16:00	Al Ahly SC (Egypt)	3–0	(Oman) Assib	25–17	25–18	25–14			75–49	
7 Feb	18:00	CJ Bauchrieh (Lebanon)	3–0	(Iraq) Ghaz Al-Janoob	25–21	25–19	25–23			75–63	

=== Semifinals ===
Date	Time		Score		Set 1	Set 2	Set 3	Set 4	Set 5	Total	Report
8 Feb	16:00	CS Sfaxien (Tunisia)	3–0	(Kuwait) Kazma Sporting Club	25–17	25–21	25–14			75–52	
8 Feb	18:00	(Lebanon) CJ Bauchrieh	1–1	(Egypt) Al Ahly SC	21–25	25–23	24–25			70–73	

=== Final ===
Date	Time		Score		Set 1	Set 2	Set 3	Set 4	Set 5	Total	Report
10 Feb	16:00	CJ Bauchrieh (Lebanon)	0–3	(Tunisia) CS Sfaxien	20–25	21–25	18–25	-	-	59–75	

== Final standing ==
Rank	Team
1st place, gold medalist(s)	(Tunisia) CS Sfaxien
2nd place, silver medalist(s)	(Lebanon) Club Jeunesse Bauchrieh
3rd place, bronze medalist(s)	(Kuwait) Kazma Sporting Club
4	(Oman) Saham Club
5	(Iraq) Ghaz Al-Janoob
6	(Libya) Al-Ahly SC (Tripoli)|Al-Ahly Tripoli
7	(Oman) Assib
8	(Kuwait) Al-Arabi SC
9	(Libya) Asswehly S.C.
10	(Morocco) FAR Rabat
11	(Iraq) Nadi Al Peshmerga
12	(Lebanon) Al Anwar Al Jadida
13	(Egypt) Al Ahly SC

== Awards ==
- Best scorer: (Pakistan) Ahmed Nassir (Club Jeunesse Bauchrieh)
- Best spiker: (Tunisia) Noureddine Hfaiedh (CS Sfaxien)
- Best blocker: (Tunisia) Hakim Zouari (CS Sfaxien)
- Best server: (Lebanon) Cristiano Campos (Club Jeunesse Bauchrieh)
- Best setter: (Kuwait) Abdallah Bouften (Kazma Sporting Club)
- Best receiver: (Tunisia) Anouer Taouerghi (CS Sfaxien)
- Best digger: (Kuwait) Abdelaziz Salim (Kazma Sporting Club)
