= Marouane Fehri =

Tunisian volleyball player (born 1979)

Personal information
- Nationality: Tunisia
- Born: 1 July 1979 (age 47)
- Height: 1.97 m (6 ft 6 in)
- Weight: 79 kg (174 lb)
- Spike: 325 cm (128 in)
- Block: 306 cm (120 in)

Volleyball information
- Number: 11

Career
Years	Teams
2004	(Tunisia) C.O. Kelibia

National team
2004	Tunisia

Marouane Fehri (born 1 July 1979) is a former Tunisian male volleyball player. He was part of the Tunisia men's national volleyball team. He competed with the national team at the 2004 Summer Olympics in Athens, Greece. He played with C.O. Kelibia in 2004.

== Clubs ==
- (Tunisia) C.O. Kelibia (2004)

== See also ==
- Tunisia at the 2004 Summer Olympics
