= Riadh Hedhili =

Tunisian volleyball player (born 1972)

Personal information
- Native name: رياض هذيلي
- Nationality: Tunisian
- Citizenship: Tunis, Tunisia
- Born: April 2, 1972; Tunis, Tunisia

Sport
- Sport: Volleyball

Riadh Hedhili (born 2 April 1972) is a Tunisian volleyball player. He competed in the men's tournament at the 1996 Summer Olympics.
