= Tunisian Men's Volleyball League =

Highest level of men's volleyball in Tunisia

- Current season, competition or edition: 2025–26 Tunisian Volleyball League
- Sport: Volleyball
- Founded: 1956; 70 years ago
- No. of teams: 12
- Country: Tunisia
- Continent: Africa (CAVB)
- Most recent champion: Espérance de Tunis (2025–26)
- Most titles: Espérance de Tunis (26 titles)
- Level on pyramid: 1
- Related competitions: African Club Championship
- Website: ftvb.org

The Tunisian Volleyball League is the highest level of men's volleyball in Tunisia and it is organized by Tunisian Volleyball Federation. Tunisia Volleyball League is currently contested by 12 clubs since the season 2025–26.

The regular season is played by 12 teams, playing each other twice, once at home and once away from home. After the regular season, the six best-placed teams enter the play-offs and the last six teams enter the play-out.

== 2023–24 Nationale A teams ==
List of The Tunisian Volleyball Clubs
Team	City	Arena	Founded	Colours	Head coach
Association sportive des PTT Sfax	Sfax	Raed Bejaoui Hall	1967		(Tunisia) Ezzeddine Chafai
Avenir de La Marsa	La Marsa	La Marsa Hall	1944		(Tunisia) Tarek El Ouni
Boumhel Bassatine Sport	Bou Mhel el-Bassatine	Boumhel Hall	1999		(Tunisia) Adel Benzid
CO Kélibia	Kélibia	Aissa Ben Nasr Hall	1957		(Tunisia) Nizar Chekili
CS Hammam Lif	Hammam Lif	Abdelaziz Ghelala Hall	1944		(Tunisia) Noureddine Ben Younes
Club Sfaxien	Sfax	Raed Bejaoui Hall	1964		(Tunisia) Ghazi Koubba
Espérance de Tunis	Tunis	Mohammed Zouaoui Sports Hall	1956		(Tunisia) Hichem Kaabi
Étoile du Sahel	Sousse	Sousse Olympic Hall	1957		(Tunisia) Walid Abbas
Fatah Hammam El Ghezaz	Hammam Ghezèze	Hammam Ghezèze Hall	1957		(Tunisia) Bilel Ben Hassine
Mouldia Sport de Bousalem	Jendouba	Bou Salem Hall	1988		(Tunisia) Amer Nasraoui
Saydia Sidi Bou Said	Sidi Bou Said	Sidi Bou Said Hall	2012		(Tunisia) Marouane Fehri
US Transport Sfax	Sfax	Raed Bejaoui Hall	1963		(Tunisia) Samir Ben Salem

Promoted: Boumhel Bassatine Sport
Relegated: Tunis Air V.C.

== List of champions ==
- 1956 : Herzellia Sports
- 1957 : Alliance sportive
- 1958 : Alliance sportive
- 1959 : EO Goulette Kram
- 1960 : Alliance sportive
- 1961 : EO Goulette Kram
- 1962 : Avenir de La Marsa
- 1963 : Avenir de La Marsa
- 1964 : Espérance de Tunis
- 1965 : Espérance de Tunis
- 1966 : Espérance de Tunis
- 1967 : Espérance de Tunis
- 1968 : Espérance de Tunis
- 1969 : Espérance de Tunis
- 1970 : Avenir de La Marsa
- 1971 : Avenir de La Marsa
- 1972 : US Transport Sfax
- 1973 : Avenir de La Marsa
- 1974 : EO Goulette Kram
- 1975 : Avenir de La Marsa
- 1976 : Espérance de Tunis
- 1977 : CO Kélibia
- 1978 : Espérance de Tunis
- 1979 : Club Sfaxien
- 1980 : Avenir de La Marsa
- 1981 : Club Africain
- 1982 : Club Sfaxien
- 1983 : Club Africain
- 1984 : Club Sfaxien
- 1985 : Club Sfaxien
- 1986 : Club Sfaxien
- 1987 : Club Sfaxien
- 1988 : Club Sfaxien
- 1989 : Club Africain
- 1990 : Club Africain
- 1991 : Club Africain
- 1992 : Club Africain
- 1993 : Espérance de Tunis
- 1994 : Club Africain
- 1995 : Étoile du Sahel
- 1996 : Espérance de Tunis
- 1997 : Espérance de Tunis
- 1998 : Espérance de Tunis
- 1999 : Espérance de Tunis
- 2000 : Étoile du Sahel
- 2001 : Étoile du Sahel
- 2002 : Étoile du Sahel
- 2003 : CO Kélibia
- 2004 : Club Sfaxien
- 2005 : Club Sfaxien
- 2006 : Étoile du Sahel
- 2007 : Espérance de Tunis
- 2008 : Espérance de Tunis
- 2009 : Club Sfaxien
- 2010 : Saydia Sports
- 2011 : Étoile du Sahel
- 2012 : Étoile du Sahel
- 2013 : Club Sfaxien
- 2014 : Étoile du Sahel
- 2015 : Espérance de Tunis
- 2016 : Espérance de Tunis
- 2017 : Étoile du Sahel
- 2018 : Espérance de Tunis
- 2019 : Espérance de Tunis
- 2020 : Espérance de Tunis
- 2021 : Espérance de Tunis
- 2022 : Espérance de Tunis
- 2023 : Espérance de Tunis
- 2024 : Espérance de Tunis
- 2025 : Espérance de Tunis
- 2026 : Espérance de Tunis

== Titles by club ==
Rk	Club	Titles #	Winning years
1	Espérance de Tunis	26	1964, 1965, 1966, 1967, 1968, 1969, 1976, 1978, 1993, 1996, 1997, 1998, 1999, 2007, 2008, 2015, 2016, 2018, 2019, 2020, 2021, 2022, 2023, 2024, 2025, 2026
2	Club Sfaxien	11	1979, 1982, 1984, 1985, 1986, 1987, 1988, 2004, 2005, 2009, 2013
3	Étoile du Sahel	9	1995, 2000, 2001, 2002, 2006, 2011, 2012, 2014, 2017
4	Avenir de La Marsa	7	1962, 1963, 1970, 1971, 1973, 1975, 1980
=	Club Africain	7	1981, 1983, 1989, 1990, 1991, 1992, 1994
6	EO Goulette Kram	3	1959, 1961, 1974
=	Alliance Sport	3	1957, 1958, 1960
8	CO Kélibia	2	1977, 2003
9	US Transport Sfax	1	1972
=	Saydia Sports	1	2010
=	Herzellia Sports	1	1956

== Notable foreign players ==
- (Puerto Rico) Héctor Soto
- (Bulgaria) Martin Stoev
- (Bulgaria) Miroslav Gradinarov

== See also ==
- Tunisian Women's Volleyball League
