= Mohamed Trabelsi (volleyball) =

Tunisian volleyball player (born 1981)

Personal information
- Nationality: Tunisia
- Born: 15 September 1981 (age 45)
- Height: 2.02 m (6 ft 8 in)
- Weight: 92 kg (203 lb)
- Spike: 340 cm (130 in)
- Block: 320 cm (130 in)

Volleyball information
- Number: 2

Career
Years	Teams
2004	(Tunisia) CS Sfaxien

National team
2004	Tunisia

Mohamed Trabelsi (born 15 September 1981) is a former Tunisian male volleyball player. He was part of the Tunisia men's national volleyball team. He competed with the national team at the 2004 Summer Olympics in Athens, Greece. He played with CS Sfaxien in 2004.

== Clubs ==
- (Tunisia) CS Sfaxien (2004)

== See also ==
- Tunisia at the 2004 Summer Olympics
