= Tunisian Men's Volleyball Cup =

- Current season, competition or edition: 2025–26 Tunisian Men's Volleyball Cup
- Sport: Volleyball
- Founded: 1957; 69 years ago
- No. of teams: 16 (in 2024)
- Country: Tunisia
- Continent: Africa (CAVB)
- Most recent champions: Espérance de Tunis (2024)
- Most titles: Espérance de Tunis (24 titles)
- Level on pyramid: 1
- Related competitions: African Cup Winners
- Website: ftvb.org

The Tunisian Men's Volleyball Cup began with 1956–57 season. It is organized by Tunisian Volleyball Federation. Clubs of all divisions takes part in this competition.

== Titles ==
Season	Winner	Score	Finalist	The sets	Place
1956–57	Étoile Goulettoise	3 – 0	Union Tunisienne		Tunis
1957–58	Étoile Goulettoise	3 – 2	Alliance Sportive		Tunis
1958–59	Étoile Goulettoise	3 – 2	Union Goulettoise		Tunis
1959–60	Union Tunisienne	3 – 2	Union Goulettoise		Tunis
1960–61	Alliance Sportive	3 – 1	Étoile Goulettoise		Tunis
1961–62	Avenir Musulman	3 – 1	Cercle des Nageurs Tunisiens		Tunis
1962–63	Avenir Musulman	3 – 2	Club Goulettois		Tunis
1963–64	Espérance de Tunis	3 – 0	AS Marsa V.C.	15–06, 15–09, 15–07	Tunis
1964–65	Espérance de Tunis	3 – 0	Club Goulettois		Tunis
1965–66	Espérance de Tunis	3 – 0	Union Culturelle de Sfax		Tunis
1966–67	Espérance de Tunis	3 – 0	Club Goulettois	15–13, 15–09, 15–13	Tunis
1967–68	AS Marsa V.C.	3 – 1	Espérance de Tunis		Tunis
1968–69	AS Marsa V.C.	3 – 0	Espérance de Tunis		Tunis
1969–70	AS Marsa V.C.	3 – 1	Saydia Sports		Tunis
1970–71	AS Marsa V.C.	3 – 0	EOG Kram V.C.		Tunis
1971–72	CO Kélibia	3 – 1	US Transport Sfax		Tunis
1972–73	AS Marsa V.C.	3 – 0	Club Sfaxien	15–08, 15–09, 15–05	Tunis
1973–74	CO Kélibia	3 – 1	US Transport Sfax	11–15, 15–10, 15–13, 15–03	Tunis
1974–75	CO Kélibia	3 – 2	Espérance de Tunis	15–02, 15–12, 08–15, 14–16, 15–02	Tunis
1975–76	CO Kélibia	3 – 0	EOG Kram V.C.		Tunis
1976–77	Club Sfaxien	3 – 2	CO Kélibia		Tunis
1977–78	CO Kélibia	3 – 2	Club Africain V.C.		Tunis
1978–79	Club Sfaxien	3 – 1	Espérance de Tunis		Tunis
1979–80	Espérance de Tunis	3 – 0	AS Marsa V.C.	15–07, 15–03, 15–09	Tunis
1980–81	Club Sfaxien	3 – 0	AS Marsa V.C.		Tunis
1981–82	Club Sfaxien	3 – 1	Club Africain V.C.		Tunis
1982–83	Club Africain V.C.	3 – 0	EOG Kram V.C.		Tunis
1983–84	Club Africain V.C.	3 – 2	Club Sfaxien		Tunis
1984–85	Club Sfaxien	3 – 1	ASPTT Sfax		Tunis
1985–86	Club Sfaxien	3 – 1	CO Kélibia	19–17, 15–13, 15–17, 15–01	Tunis
1986–87	Club Sfaxien	3 – 0	ASPTT Sfax		Tunis
1987–88	AS Marsa V.C.	3 – 2	Club Sfaxien		Tunis
1988–89	CO Kélibia	3 – 1	AS Marsa V.C.		Tunis
1989–90	Club Africain V.C.	3 – 2	Saydia Sports		Tunis
1990–91	Club Africain V.C.	3 – 2	CO Kélibia		Tunis
1991–92	Club Africain V.C.	3 – 2	CO Kélibia		Tunis
1992–93	Espérance de Tunis	3 – 0	CO Kélibia	15–09, 15–05, 15–12	Tunis
1993–94	Espérance de Tunis	3 – 1	US Transport Sfax		Tunis
1994–95	Étoile du Sahel	3 – 0	Saydia Sports		Tunis
1995–96	Espérance de Tunis	3 – 0	US Transport Sfax		Tunis
1996–97	Espérance de Tunis	3 – 2	Étoile du Sahel		Tunis
1997–98	Étoile du Sahel	3 – 1	Espérance de Tunis		Tunis
1998–99	Espérance de Tunis	3 – 2	Étoile du Sahel		Tunis
1999–00	Espérance de Tunis	3 – 0	Étoile du Sahel		Tunis
2000–01	Étoile du Sahel	3 – 0	Club Sfaxien		Ariana
2001–02	Club Sfaxien	3 – 2	Étoile du Sahel		Tunis
2002–03	Saydia Sports	3 – 2	CO Kélibia		Tunis
2003–04	CO Kélibia	3 – 1	Étoile du Sahel		Tunis
2004–05	Club Sfaxien	3 – 2	Étoile du Sahel		Radès
2005–06	Étoile du Sahel	3 – 1	CO Kélibia		Radès
2006–07	Espérance de Tunis	3 – 0	Étoile du Sahel	25–17, 25–21, 25–23	Radès
2007–08	Étoile du Sahel	3 – 1	Club Sfaxien	25–23, 20–25, 25–17, 25–19	Tunis
2008–09	Club Sfaxien	3 – 2	Espérance de Tunis	25–23, 20–25, 16–25, 25–17, 15–11	Tunis
2009–10	Espérance de Tunis	3 – 2	Saydia Sports	25–23, 17–25, 27–25, 12–25, 13–15	Tunis
2010–11	CO Kélibia	3 − 1	Saydia Sports	25–19, 21–25, 25–20, 25–23	Tunis
2011–12	Club Sfaxien	3 − 1	Espérance de Tunis	25–14, 16–25, 25–19, 25–16	Tunis
2012–13	Club Sfaxien	3 − 1	Espérance de Tunis	28–26, 25–23, 15–25, 25–22	Tunis
2013–14	Espérance de Tunis	3 − 0	Étoile du Sahel	25–17, 25–16, 25–21	Tunis
2014–15	Étoile du Sahel	3 − 2	Espérance de Tunis	25-22, 25–20, 25–27, 18–25, 15-10	Tunis
2015–16	Étoile du Sahel	3 − 0	Espérance de Tunis	35-33, 25–18, 25-21	Tunis
2016–17	Espérance de Tunis	3 − 2	Étoile du Sahel	26-28, 22–25, 25–20, 26–24, 15-10	Tunis
2017–18	Espérance de Tunis	3 − 0	Étoile du Sahel	25-19, 25–19, 25-22	Radès
2018–19	Espérance de Tunis	3 − 0	Étoile du Sahel	25-20, 25–19, 25-13	Radès
2019–20	Espérance de Tunis	3 − 0	Club Sfaxien	25-19, 25–19, 25-23	Radès
2020–21	Espérance de Tunis	3 − 0	Club Sfaxien	25-20, 25–15, 25-21	Sidi Bou Said
2021–22	Espérance de Tunis	3 − 0	Étoile du Sahel	26-24, 25–19, 25-21	Radès
2022–23	Espérance de Tunis	3 − 0	AS Marsa V.C.	33-31, 25–23, 25-14	Ariana
2023–24	Espérance de Tunis	3 − 2	Étoile du Sahel	25-17, 23–25, 25-23, 21-25, 21-19	Radès

=== Performance by club ===
Rk	Club	Cups	Season
1	Espérance de Tunis	24	1964, 1965, 1966, 1967, 1980, 1993, 1994, 1996, 1997, 1999, 2000, 2007, 2010, 2014, 2017, 2018, 2019, 2020, 2021, 2022, 2023, 2024, 2025, 2026
2	Club Sfaxien	12	1977, 1979, 1981, 1982, 1985, 1986, 1987, 2002, 2005, 2009, 2012, 2013
3	CO Kélibia	8	1972, 1974, 1975, 1976, 1978, 1989, 2004, 2011
=	AS Marsa V.C.	8	1962, 1963, 1968, 1969, 1970, 1971, 1973, 1988
5	Étoile du Sahel V.C.	7	1995, 1998, 2001, 2006, 2008, 2015, 2016
6	Club Africain V.C.	5	1983, 1984, 1990, 1991, 1992
7	EO Goulette Kram V.C.	3	1957, 1958, 1959
8	Saydia Sports	1	2003
=	Union Tunisienne	1	1960
=	Alliance Sportive	1	1961

== See also ==
- Tunisian Women's Volleyball Cup
