= Samir Sellami =

Tunisian volleyball player (born 1977)

Personal information
- Nationality: Tunisia
- Born: 13 July 1977 (age 49)
- Height: 1.94 m (6 ft 4 in)
- Weight: 82 kg (181 lb)
- Spike: 320 cm (130 in)
- Block: 308 cm (121 in)

Volleyball information
- Number: 5

Career
Years	Teams
2004	(Tunisia) CS Sfaxien

National team
2004	Tunisia

Samir Sellami (born July 13, 1977) is a former Tunisian male volleyball player. He was part of the Tunisia men's national volleyball team. He competed with the national team at the 2004 Summer Olympics in Athens, Greece. He played with CS Sfaxien in 2004.

== Clubs ==
- (Tunisia) CS Sfaxien (2004)

== See also ==
- Tunisia at the 2004 Summer Olympics
