= Men's African Volleyball Club Championship =

African Volleyball Clubs Champions Championship
- Current season, competition or edition: 2024 African Volleyball Clubs Champions Championship
- Sport: Volleyball
- Founded: 1980
- Country: CAVB members
- Continent: Africa
- Most recent champion: (Egypt) Al Ahly (2026)
- Most titles: (Egypt) Al Ahly (17 titles)
- Website: CAVB.org

The African Volleyball Clubs Champions Championship is the most important men's competition for volleyball clubs in Africa organised by the African Volleyball Confederation.

== Results ==
Year	Host	Final			Third place match		
Year	Host	Champion	Score	Runner-up	Third place	Score	Fourth place
1980; Details	(Egypt); Cairo	(Egypt); Al Ahly SC	–	(Egypt); Zamalek SC		–	
1983; Details	(Egypt); Cairo	(Egypt); Al Ahly SC	–	(Egypt); Zamalek SC		–	
1984; Details	(Egypt); Port Said	(Egypt); Zamalek SC	3 – 2	(Egypt); Al Ahly SC	(Tunisia); Club Africain VB	–	
1985; Details	(Tunisia); Sfax	(Tunisia); CS Sfaxien VB	–	(Egypt); Zamalek SC		–	
1986; Details	(Senegal); Dakar	(Tunisia); CS Sfaxien VB	–	(Egypt); Zamalek SC		–	
1987; Details	(Egypt); Cairo	(Egypt); Zamalek SC	3 – 1	(Egypt); Al Ahly SC	(Nigeria); Kano Sports	–	(Algeria); MC Alger VB
1988; Details	(Algeria); Algiers	(Algeria); MC Alger VB	–	(Algeria); ES Sétif VB		–	
1989; Details	(Tunisia); Sfax	(Tunisia); CS Sfaxien VB	–	(Algeria); MC Alger VB		–	
1990; Details	(Kenya); Nairobi	(Algeria); NA Hussein Dey VB	–	(Algeria); MC Alger VB		–	
1991; Details	(Morocco); Casablanca	(Tunisia); Club Africain VB	–	(Algeria); MC Alger VB		–	(Egypt); Zamalek SC
1992; Details	(Nigeria); Kano	(Tunisia); Club Africain VB	–	(Cameroon); AES Sonel	(Algeria); MC Alger VB	–	
1993; Details	(Tunisia); Tunis	(Tunisia); Club Africain VB	–	(Egypt); Zamalek SC		–	
1994; Details	(Tunisia); Tunis	(Tunisia); ES Tunis VC	–	(Algeria); NA Hussein Dey VB		–	
1995; Details	(Kenya); Nairobi	(Egypt); Al Ahly SC	3 – 0	(Tunisia); ES Sahel VC	(Tunisia); ES Tunis VC	3 – 1	(Algeria); MC Alger VB
1996; Details	(Ivory Coast); Abidjan	(Egypt); Al Ahly SC	3 – 1	(Tunisia); ES Sahel VC	(Tunisia); ES Tunis VC	3 – 0	(Algeria); MC Alger VB
1997; Details	(Senegal); Dakar	(Egypt); Al Ahly SC	–	(Algeria); MC Alger VB		–	
1998; Details	(Tunisia); Tunis	(Tunisia); ES Tunis VC	3 – 1	(Algeria); USM Blida VB	(Tunisia); ES Sahel VC	3 – 2	(Egypt); Zamalek SC
1999; Details	(Tunisia); Tunis	(Tunisia); CS Sfaxien VB	3 – 2	(Tunisia); ES Tunis VC		–	(Tunisia); ES Sahel VC
2000; Details	(Tunisia); Tunis	(Tunisia); ES Tunis VC	3 – 1	(Tunisia); CS Sfaxien VB		–	
2001; Details	(Tunisia); Sousse	(Tunisia); ES Sahel VC	3 – 0	(Tunisia); CS Sfaxien VB		–	
2002; Details	(Ivory Coast); Abidjan	(Tunisia); ES Sahel VC	3 – 0	(Egypt); Zamalek SC		–	
2003; Details	(Egypt); Cairo	(Egypt); Al Ahly SC	–	(Tunisia); CO Kélibia	(Cameroon); FAP Yaoundé	–	
2004; Details	(Algeria); Annaba	(Egypt); Al Ahly SC	3 – 1	(Tunisia); CO Kélibia	(Algeria); WA Tlemcen VB	–	
2005; Details	(Benin); Cotonou	(Tunisia); CS Sfaxien VB	–	(Cameroon); FAP Yaoundé	GSU Kenya	–	
2006; Details	(South Africa); Durban	(Egypt); Al Ahly SC	–	(Tunisia); CS Sfaxien VB	(Algeria); MC Alger VB	–	
2007; Details	(Niger); Niamey	(Algeria); MC Alger VB	–	(Egypt); Tala'ea El-Gaish SC	(Egypt); Al Ahly SC	–	
2008; Details	(Libya); Misrata	(Egypt); Zamalek SC	3 – 1	(Egypt); Al Ahly SC	(Tunisia); ES Tunis VC	3 – 1	(Libya); Asswehly
2009; Details	(Egypt); Cairo	(Egypt); Zamalek SC	3 – 2	(Egypt); Al Ahly SC	(Libya); Al-Ahly SC	3 – 2	(Cameroon); FAP Yaoundé
2010; Details	(Tunisia); Sfax	(Egypt); Al Ahly SC	3 – 1	(Egypt); Zamalek SC	(Tunisia); CS Sfaxien VB	3 – 0	(Algeria); NR Bordj Bou Arréridj
2011; Details	(Egypt); Cairo	(Egypt); Al Ahly SC	3 – 0	Kenya Prisons VC	(Egypt); Tala'ea El-Gaish SC	3 – 0	Rwanda University
2012; Details	(Tunisia); Sousse	(Egypt); Zamalek SC	3 – 1	(Tunisia); ES Sahel VC	(Algeria); NR Bordj Bou Arréridj	3 – 0	(Egypt); Al Ahly SC
2013; Details	(Libya); Tripoli	(Tunisia); CS Sfaxien VB	3 – 2	(Tunisia); ES Tunis VC	(Libya); Al-Ahly SC	3 – 0	Kenya Prisons VC
2014; Details	(Tunisia); Sousse	(Tunisia); ES Tunis VC	3 – 0	(Egypt); Al Ahly SC	(Tunisia); CS Sfaxien	3 – 1	(Tunisia); Étoile du Sahel
2015; Details	(Tunisia); Sousse	(Egypt); Al Ahly SC	3 – 1	(Tunisia); ES Tunis VC	(Tunisia); Étoile du Sahel	3 – 0	(Egypt); Smouha SC
2016; Details	(Egypt); Cairo	(Egypt); Tala'ea El-Gaish SC	3 – 1	(Tunisia); ES Tunis VC	(Egypt); Smouha SC	3 – 2	(Libya); Asswehly S.C.
2017; Details	(Tunisia); Tunis	(Egypt); Al Ahly SC	3 – 1	(Tunisia); ES Sahel VC	(Algeria); NR Bordj Bou Arréridj	3 – 0	(Libya); Asswehly S.C.
2018; Details	(Egypt); Cairo	(Egypt); Al Ahly SC	3 – 0	(Egypt); Tala'ea El-Gaish SC	(Egypt); Smouha SC	3 – 2	(Libya); Asswehly S.C.
2019; Details	(Egypt); Cairo	(Egypt); Al Ahly SC	3 – 0	(Egypt); Smouha SC	(Libya); Al-Ahly SC	3 – 1	(Libya); Asswehly S.C.
2020	canceled due to COVID-19 pandemic						
2021; Details	(Tunisia); Tunis	(Tunisia); ES Tunis VC	3 – 0	(Egypt); Zamalek SC	(Libya); Asswehly S.C.	3 – 0	(Tunisia); CO Kélibia
2022; Details	(Tunisia); Kelibia; El Haouaria	(Egypt); Al Ahly SC	3 – 1	(Tunisia); ES Tunis VC	(Rwanda); Gisagara VC	3 – 1	(Cameroon); Port Douala VC
2023; Details	(Tunisia); Nabeul; Grombalia	(Tunisia); MS Boussalem	3 – 2	(Egypt); Zamalek SC	(Algeria); ASC Ouled Adouane	3 – 0	(Cameroon); Port Douala VC
2024; Details	(Egypt); Cairo	(Egypt); Al Ahly SC	3 – 0	(Tunisia); MS Boussalem	Kenya Prisons VC	3 – 2	(Libya); Al-Nasr SC
2025; Details	(Libya); Misrata	(Libya); Asswehly SC	3 – 2	(Tunisia); ES Tunis VC	(Egypt); Al Ahly SC	3 – 0	(Rwanda); APR
2026; Details	(Rwanda); Kigali	(Egypt); Al Ahly SC	3 – 0	(Rwanda); Police VC	(Rwanda); REG	3 – 1	(Egypt); Petrojet SC

=== By club ===
Rank	Club	Winners	Runners-up	Years won
1	Al Ahly SC	17	5	1980, 1983, 1995, 1996, 1997, 2003, 2004, 2006, 2010, 2011, 2015, 2017, 2018, 2019, 2022, 2024, 2026
2	CS Sfaxien	6	3	1985, 1986, 1989, 1999, 2005, 2013
3	Zamalek SC	5	9	1984, 1987, 2008, 2009, 2012
4	ES Tunis VC	5	6	1994, 1998, 2000, 2014, 2021
5	Club Africain VB	3	0	1991, 1992, 1993
6	ES Sahel VC	2	4	2001, 2002
6	GS Pétroliers VB	2	4	1988, 2007
8	Tala'ea El-Gaish SC	1	2	2016
9	NA Hussein Dey VB	1	1	1990
9	MS Boussalem	1	1	2023
11	Asswehly SC	1	0	2025

- Rq:

GS Pétroliers VB (ex. MC Alger VB)

=== By country ===
Rank	Country	Winners	Runners-up	Years won
1	Egypt	23	17	1980, 1983, 1985, 1987, 1995, 1996, 1997, 2003, 2004, 2006, 2008, 2009, 2010, 2011, 2012, 2015, 2016, 2017, 2018, 2019, 2022, 2024, 2026
2	Tunisia	17	16	1985, 1986, 1989, 1991, 1992, 1993, 1994, 1998, 1999, 2000, 2001, 2002, 2005, 2013, 2014, 2021, 2023
3	Algeria	3	7	1990, 1988, 2007
4	Libya	1	0	2025
5	Cameroon	0	2	
6	Kenya	0	1	
7	Rwanda	0	1	

== See also ==
- African Volleyball Cup Winners' Cup
