= Arab Clubs Championship (volleyball) =

Sports league

Arab Clubs Champions Championship
- Current season, competition or edition: 2026 Arab Volleyball Clubs Champions Championship
- Sport: Volleyball
- Founded: 1978
- Country: AVA members
- Most recent champions: Police SC Qatar
- Most titles: (Egypt) Al Ahly SC (8 titles)
- Website: http://arabvolleyball.org

The Arab Clubs Champions Championship is a sport competition for club volleyball teams, currently held annually and organized by the Arab Volleyball Association. the first edition was played in Libya in 1978.

== Results ==
Year	Host	Final			Third place match		
Year	Host	Champion	Score	Runner-up	Third place	Score	Fourth place
1978; Details	Libya	(Libya); Al-Tarsana SC	–	(Tunisia); ES Tunis		–	
1983; Details	(Morocco); Rabat	(Tunisia); CS Sfaxien	–	(Iraq); Al-Jaish SC		–	
1984; Details	Kuwait	(Iraq); Al-Jaish SC	3–1	(Tunisia); CS Sfaxien		–	
1985; Details	Tunisia	(Tunisia); CS Sfaxien	–	(Algeria); PO Chlef		–	
1986; Details	Egypt	(Egypt); Zamalek SC	–	(Algeria); MC Alger	(Saudi Arabia); Al Ahli	–	(Jordan); Al-Diffatain Club
1987; Details	Jordan	(Egypt); Al Ahly SC	–	(Kuwait); Qadsia SC	(Iraq); Al-Rasheed SC	–	(Saudi Arabia); Al Ahli
1988; Details		Cancelled			Cancelled		
1989; Details	Iraq	(Iraq); Al-Rasheed SC	–	(Saudi Arabia); Al Ahli	(Kuwait); Qadsia SC	–	(Egypt); Zamalek SC
1990; Details		Cancelled			Cancelled		
1991; Details		Cancelled			Cancelled		
1992; Details	Tunisia	(Tunisia); Club Africain	–	(Saudi Arabia); Al Ahli	(Qatar); Al Arabi	–	(United Arab Emirates); Al-Wasl F.C.
1993; Details	Egypt	(Egypt); Zamalek SC	3–1	Egypt Air	(United Arab Emirates); Al Ain FC	3–0	(Bahrain); Al-Muharraq SC
1994; Details	(Lebanon); Beirut	(Tunisia); Club Africain	–	(Algeria); MC Alger	(Saudi Arabia); Al-Hilal	–	(United Arab Emirates); Al Jazira Club
1995; Details	Tunisia	(Tunisia); ES Sahel	–	(Tunisia); Club Africain	(Saudi Arabia); Al Ahli	–	(United Arab Emirates); Al-Wasl F.C.
1996; Details	(Saudi Arabia); Riyadh	(Saudi Arabia); Al-Hilal	3–2	(Egypt); Al Ahly SC	(Tunisia); ES Tunis	–	(Saudi Arabia); Al Ahli
1997; Details	Lebanon	(Saudi Arabia); Al-Hilal	–	(Saudi Arabia); Al Ahli	(Egypt); Zamalek SC	–	(Qatar); Al Arabi
1998; Details	Lebanon	(Tunisia); CO Kélibia	–	(Qatar); Al Rayyan SC	(Saudi Arabia); Al-Hilal	–	(Saudi Arabia); Al Ahli
1999; Details	(Morocco); Rabat	(Tunisia); CS Sfaxien	–	(Saudi Arabia); Al Ahli	(Algeria); USM Annaba	–	(Lebanon); Arriyadhi Ghazir
2000; Details	Tunisia	(Tunisia); CS Sfaxien	–	(Tunisia); ES Sahel	Qatar SC	–	(Saudi Arabia); Al Ahli
2001; Details	Jordan	(Egypt); Al Ahly SC	3–1	(Egypt); Zamalek SC	(Algeria); USM Blida	3–0	(Qatar); Al Rayyan SC
2002; Details	(Lebanon); Beirut	(Egypt); Al Ahly SC	3–0	(Qatar); Al Arabi	(Bahrain); Al-Najma SC	3–0	(Lebanon); Arriyadhi Ghazir
2003; Details	(Jordan); Amman	(Qatar); Al Arabi	–	(Bahrain); Al-Najma SC	Qatar SC	–	(Saudi Arabia); Al Ahli
2004; Details		Cancelled			Cancelled		
2005; Details	(Egypt); Cairo	(Egypt); Al Ahly SC	3–0	(Saudi Arabia); Al-Hilal	(Qatar); Al Arabi	–	(Qatar); Al Rayyan SC
2006; Details	(Syria); Damascus	(Egypt); Al Ahly SC	3–1	(Saudi Arabia); Al Ahli	(Egypt); Zamalek SC	3–0	(Qatar); Al Arabi
2007; Details	(Tunisia); Tunis	(Tunisia); ES Tunis	3–0	(Tunisia); ES Sahel	(United Arab Emirates); Al Nasr	3–1	(Kuwait); Al Arabi
2008; Details	(Libya); Benghazi	(Tunisia); CS Sfaxien	3–1	(Tunisia); ES Tunis	(Algeria); MC Alger	3–2	(Qatar); Al Arabi
2009; Details	(Lebanon); Beirut	(Saudi Arabia); Al-Hilal	3–1	(Egypt); Al Ahly SC	(Algeria); MB Béjaïa	3–2	(Saudi Arabia); Al Ahli
2010; Details	(Egypt); Cairo	(Egypt); Al Ahly SC	3–1	(Saudi Arabia); Al-Hilal	(Bahrain); Al-Najma SC	3–2	(Libya); Al Ahly Tripoli
2011; Details	(Saudi Arabia); Riyadh	(Saudi Arabia); Al-Hilal	3–0	(Tunisia); CS Sfaxien	(Saudi Arabia); Al Ahli	3–2	(Lebanon); Al Anwar
2012; Details	(Lebanon); Beirut	(Algeria); MB Béjaïa	3–2	(Qatar); Al Rayyan SC	(Saudi Arabia); Al Ahli	3–2	(Lebanon); Al Anwar
2013; Details	(Lebanon); Beirut	(Tunisia); CS Sfaxien	3–0	(Lebanon); CJ Bauchrieh	(Kuwait); Kazma SC	3–0	(Egypt); Al Ahly SC
2014; Details	(Tunisia); Tunis	(Tunisia); ES Tunis	3–0	(Bahrain); Dar Kulaib Club	(Libya); Ittihad Misurata	3–0	(Lebanon); Zahra Club
2015; Details	Egypt	(Bahrain); Al-Ahli	3–1	(Egypt); El Giesh	(Qatar); El Jaish	3–2	(Bahrain); Dar Kulaib
2016; Details	(Tunisia); Msaken; Sousse	(Tunisia); ES Sahel	3–1	(Egypt); Smouha	(Tunisia); CS Sfaxien	3–0	(Libya); Asswehly
2017; Details	Bahrain	(Bahrain); Al-Ahli	3–2	(Qatar); El Jaish	(Qatar); Al Rayyan SC	3–1	(Oman); Al-Salam
2018; Details	(Tunisia); Tunis	(Qatar); Al Rayyan SC	3–0	(Tunisia); ES Tunis	(Saudi Arabia); Al-Hilal	3–2	(Qatar); Al Arabi
2019; Details	(Tunisia); Tunis	(Qatar); Al Rayyan SC	3–2	(Tunisia); ES Tunis	Police SC Qatar	3–0	(Algeria); MC Alger
2020; Details	(Egypt); Cairo	(Egypt); Al Ahly SC	3–0	(Egypt); Zamalek SC	(Bahrain); Al-Ahli	3–0	(Kuwait); Kazma SC
2021; Details		Cancelled because of the COVID-19			Cancelled because of the COVID-19		
2022; Details	(Tunisia); Tunis	(Qatar); Al Rayyan SC	3–0	(Bahrain); Dar Kulaib Club	(Tunisia); ES Tunis	3–0	(Qatar); Al Ahli SC
2023; Details	(Egypt); Cairo	(Egypt); Al Ahly SC	3–0	(Bahrain); Al-Nasr SC	(Oman); Al-Seeb Club	3–2	(Qatar); Al-Wakrah SC
2024; Details	(Jordan); Amman	(Libya); Asswehly	3–1	Qatar SC	Police SC Qatar	3–0	(Oman); Al-Seeb Club
2025; Details	(Qatar); Doha	(Egypt); Zamalek SC	3–0	(Egypt); Al Ahly SC	(Oman); Al-Seeb Club	3–1	Police SC Qatar
2026; Details	(Tunisia); Tunis	Police SC Qatar	3–1	(Tunisia); ES Sahel		–	

=== By Club ===
Rank	Club	Winner	Runner-up	Third	Total
1	(Egypt) Al Ahly SC	8	3	0	11
2	(Tunisia) CS Sfaxien	6	2	1	9
3	(Saudi Arabia) Al-Hilal	4	2	3	9
4	(Egypt) Zamalek	3	2	2	7
5	(Qatar) Al-Rayyan SC	3	2	1	6
6	(Tunisia) ES Tunis	2	4	2	8
7	(Tunisia) ES Sahel	2	3	0	5
8	(Tunisia) Club Africain	2	1	0	3
9	(Bahrain) Al-Ahli Club	2	0	1	3
10	(Qatar) Al Arabi	1	1	2	4
11	(Iraq) Al-Jaish SC	1	1	0	2
12	Police SC Qatar	1	0	2	3
13	(Algeria) MB Béjaïa	1	0	1	2
-	(Iraq) Al-Rasheed SC	1	0	1	2
15	(Libya) Asswehly	1	0	0	1
-	(Tunisia) CO Kélibia	1	0	0	1
-	(Libya) Al-Tarsana SC	1	0	0	1

=== By Country ===
Country	Winner	Years won
Tunisia	13	1983, 1985, 1992, 1994, 1995, 1998, 1999, 2000, 2007, 2008, 2013, 2014, 2016
Egypt	11	1986, 1987, 1993, 2001, 2002, 2005, 2006, 2010, 2020, 2023, 2025
Qatar	5	2003, 2018, 2019, 2022, 2026
Saudi Arabia	4	1996, 1997, 2009, 2011
Bahrain	2	2015, 2017
Iraq	2	1984, 1989
Libya	2	1978, 2024
Algeria	1	2012

== See also ==
- Women's Arab volleyball clubs championship
