= Chaker Ghezal =

Tunisian volleyball player (born 1977)

Personal information
- Nationality: Tunisia
- Born: 14 January 1977 (age 49)
- Height: 1.99 m (6 ft 6 in)
- Weight: 90 kg (198 lb)
- Spike: 352 cm (139 in)
- Block: 335 cm (132 in)

Volleyball information
- Number: 7

Career
Years	Teams
2004	(Tunisia) E.S. Sahel

National team
2004	Tunisia

Chaker Ghezal (born 14 January 1977) is a former Tunisian male volleyball player. He was part of the Tunisia men's national volleyball team. He competed with the national team at the 2004 Summer Olympics in Athens, Greece. He played with Étoile Sportive du Sahel in 2004.

== Clubs ==
- (Tunisia) E.S. Sahel (2004)

== See also ==
- Tunisia at the 2004 Summer Olympics
