= Étoile Sportive du Sahel V.C. =

Tunisian volleyball club

Étoile du Sahel V. C.
- Full name: Étoile Sportive du Sahel
- Short name: ESS
- Founded: 1957
- Ground: Sousse Indoor Sports Hall, Sousse, Tunisia (Capacity: 5,000)
- League: Tunisian Volleyball League
- 2021–22: 3rd
- Website: Club home page

Uniforms
Home	Away

The Étoile Sportive du Sahel Volleyball Club (Arabic: النجم الرياضى الساحلى للكرة الطائرة, often referred to as ESS) is one of Étoile du Sahel club's sections that represent the club in Tunisia and international volleyball competitions, the club team section based in Sousse since the year 1957.

== Honors ==
=== National Achievements ===
- Tunisian League :

Winners (9 titles) : 1994–95, 1999–20, 2000–01, 2001–02, 2005–06, 2010–11, 2011–12, 2013-14, 2016-17
Runners-Up :
Third-Place :

- Tunisian Cup :

Winners (7 cups) : 1994–95, 1997–98, 2000–01, 2005–06, 2007–08, 2014-15, 2015-16
Runners-Up (11 vice champions) : 1996–97, 1998–99, 1999–00, 2001–02, 2003–04, 2004-05, 2006-07, 2013-14, 2016–17, 2017–18, 2018–19

- Tunisian Supercup :

Winners (3x Supercups) : 2006–07, 2009–10, 2016–17

=== Regional Achievements ===
- Arab Clubs Championship :

Winners (2 title) : 1995, 2016
Runners-up (2 vice champions) : 2000, 2007

=== International Achievements ===
- African Club Championship :

Winners (2 titles) : 2001, 2002
Runners-Up (4 vice champions) : 1995, 1996, 2012, 2017

- African Volleyball Cup Winners' Cup :

Winners (1 x title) : 2001

Runners up (1 x vice champions) : 2006

== Team squad 2025/26 ==
No	Player name	Nationality	Position	Height (cm)	Year of birth
8	Ala Lachaal	Tunisia	Setter	193	—
15	Haykel Jerbi	Tunisia	Setter	199	1988
9	Hamza Hfaiedh	Tunisia	Outside Hitter	192	2002
10	Omar Hfaiedh	Tunisia	Outside Hitter	183	2008
18	Mohamed Chaouch	Tunisia	Outside Hitter	188	1999
20	Ala Samoud	Tunisia	Outside Hitter	193	1998
—	Ayoub Falleh	Tunisia	Outside Hitter	187	2005
17	Wajdi Baroudi	Tunisia	Middle-blocker	200	2002
—	Adem Falleh	Tunisia	Middle-blocker	198	2003
12	Mohamed Ridene	Tunisia	Libero	180	1996
—	Hamza Khlifi	Tunisia	Libero	—	—

== Head coaches ==
This is a list of the senior team's head coaches in the recent years.

Dates	Name
→	
→	
→	
→	
→	
→	

As of 2014

== Notable players ==
Tunisia

- (Tunisia) Noureddine Hfaiedh
- (Tunisia) Chaker Ghezal
- (Tunisia) Hichem Ben Romdhane

== Presidents ==
N°	Country	Name	Years
1	(Tunisia)	Ali Driss	1957–1959
2	(Tunisia)	Mohamed Atoui	1959–1960
3	(Tunisia)	Ali Driss	1960–1961
4	(Tunisia)	Hamed Karoui	1961–1981
5	(Tunisia)	Abdeljelil Bouraoui	1981–1984
6	(Tunisia)	Hamadi Mestiri	1984–1988
7	(Tunisia)	Abdeljelil Bouraoui	1988–1990
8	(Tunisia)	Hamadi Mestiri	1990–1993
9	(Tunisia)	Othman Jenayah	1993–2006
10	(Tunisia)	Moez Driss	2006–2009
11	(Tunisia)	Hamed Kammoun	2009–2011
12	(Tunisia)	Hafedh Hmaied	2011–2012
13	(Tunisia)	Ridha Charfeddine	2012–2021
14	(Tunisia)	Maher Karoui	2021–present
