= CS Sfaxien (men's volleyball) =

Tunisian volleyball club

- Full name: Club Sportif Sfaxien
- Short name: CSS
- Founded: 1928
- Ground: Raed Bejaoui Hall, Sfax (Capacity: 4,000)
- League: Tunisian Volleyball League
- 2021–22: 2
- Website: Club home page

Uniforms
Home	Away

The Club Sportif Sfaxien Volleyball Club (Arabic: النادي الرياضي الصفاقسي للكرة الطائرة, often referred to as CSS) is one of CS Sfaxien club's sections that represent the club in Tunisia and international volleyball competitions, the club team based in Sfax.

== History ==
The Club Sportif Sfaxien is a Tunisian sports team founded in 1928 in Sfax. The club has won the Tunisian Championship 11 times, the Tunisia cup 12 times, seven Arab Championships (record) and six African Club Championships. It was the first African club to play in the Volleyball Club World Championship in 1989 in Italy.

CS Sfaxien's active sections
Football	Basketball	Volleyball
Rugby	Weightlifting	Boxing (Defunct)
- Judo (Defunct)

== 2013 squad ==
Squad as of October 16, 2013

Number	Player	Position	Height (m)
2	(Tunisia) Mohamed Trabelsi	Middle blocker	2.02
4	(Tunisia) Mohamed Ali Louati	Opposite	1.88
5	(Tunisia) Samir Sellami	Setter	1.94
6	(Tunisia) Omar Agrebi	Middle blocker	2.05
7	(Tunisia) Mohamed Arbi Ben Abdallah	Opposite	1.94
8	(Tunisia) Niaz Sallem	Outside hitter	1.81
9	(Tunisia) Noureddine Hfaiedh	Outside hitter	1.97
10	(Tunisia) Racem Siala	Opposite	1.87
11	(Tunisia) Ismail Moalla	Outside hitter	1.95
12	(Tunisia) Anouar Taouerghi	Libero	1.80
16	(Tunisia) Hakim Zouari	Middle blocker	1.97
17	(Tunisia) Rami Bennour	Setter	1.86
..	(Tunisia) Mohamed Slim Chkili	Outside hitter	1.95
..	(Bulgaria) Todor Valchev	Opposite	

- Head coach: (Tunisia) Mohamed Ben Mustapha
- Assistant coach: (Serbia) Dragan Svetozarevic

== Honors ==
=== National achievements ===
- Tunisian League :

Winners (11 titles) : 1978–79, 1981–82, 1983–84, 1984–85, 1985–86, 1986–87, 1987–88, 2003–04, 2004–05, 2008–09, 2012–13
Runners up (10 times) : 1976–77, 1977–78, 1980–81, 1982–83, 1988–89, 1989–90, 1998–99, 2002–03, 2011–12, 2017–18

- Tunisian Cup :

Winners (12 cups) : 1976–77, 1978–79, 1980–81, 1981–82, 1984–85, 1985–86, 1986–87, 2001–02, 2004–05, 2008–09, 2011–12, 2012–13

- Tunisian Supercup :

Winners (1 Supercup) : 2004–05

=== Regional achievements ===
- Arab Clubs Championship :

Winners (6 titles) : 1983,1985, 1999, 2000, 2008, 2013

=== International achievements ===
- African Club Championship :

Winners (6 titles) : 1985, 1986, 1989, 1999, 2005, 2013

- FIVB Volleyball Men's Club World Championship

5th place : 2013
6th place : 1989

== Head coaches ==
This is a list of the senior team's head coaches in the recent years.

Dates	Name
→	
→	
→	
→	
→	
→	

As of 2014

== Notable players ==
Nigeria: Usman Abdallah

- (Tunisia) Noureddine Hfaiedh
- (Tunisia) Chaker Ghezal

Europe

- (Bulgaria) Martin Stoev

== See also ==
- CS Sfaxien
- CS Sfaxien Women's Volleyball
- CS Sfaxien Women's Basketball
