= Club Olympique de Kélibia =

Tunisian volleyball club

- Full name: Club Olympique de Kélibia
- Short name: COK
- Founded: 1957
- Ground: Aissa Ben Nasr Hall, Kélibia
- Chairman: Jamel Laswed
- Manager: Faouzi Haouari (men); Lassad Mahfoudh (women)
- League: Tunisian Volleyball League (men); Tunisian Volleyball League (women)
- Website: Club home page

Uniforms
Home	Away

Club Olympique de Kélibia (Arabic: النادي الأولمبي القليبي), known as COK, is a Tunisian volleyball club founded in 1957 and formalized on 10 March 1959.

== History ==
It begins to shine from the 1959–1960 season during which It reaches the semi-finals of the Tunisian men's volleyball cup and wins the division 3 championship with a formation including Savior Mazzara, Abdelkader Ben Nasr, Hamadi Ben Sheikh, Mahmoud Ben Sheikh and Hamouda Ben Messaoud. In 1963–1964, It was second in the play-offs and entered division 1.

Club based primarily on volleyball, wholly owns 16 categories (men and women) and has 452 licensees (boys and girls), 10% of the number of Tunisian national teams.

== Honours ==
- Men (Senior):

National	International	Regional
Tunisian Volleyball League (2) : Winners : 1976–77, 2002–03 Tunisian Volleyball Cup (8) : Winners : 1971–72, 1973–74, 1974–75, 1975–76, 1977–78, 1988–89, 2003–04, 2010–11 Runners-up (7) : 1976–77, 1985–86, 1990–91, 1991–92, 1992–93, 2002–03, 2005–06 Tunisian Federation Cup (0) : Runners-up (1) : 2020–21	African Clubs Championship (0) : Runners-up (2) : 2003, 2004 African Cup Winners' Cup (0) : Runners-up (1) : 2004	Arab Clubs Championship (1) : Winners : 1998

- Women (Senior) :

National	International	Regional
Tunisian Volleyball League (0) : Tunisian Volleyball Cup (3) : Winners : 2002–03, 2003–04, 2005–06 Tunisian Super Cup (1) : Winners : 2002–03 Tunisian Federation Cup (1) : Winners : 2021–22	African Clubs Championship (0) : African Cup Winners' Cup (0) :	Arab Clubs Championship (0) :

== Human resources ==
=== Steering Committee ===
- President: Aida Lengliz
- Vice president: Riadh Ben Cheikh
- Vice president: Med Ben Hamed
- Secretary-General: Sinen Ben Rejeb
- Treasurer: Moez Ben Youssef

=== Technical staff ===
- Technical Director: Lotfi Ben Slimane
- Senior coach men: Med Ali Ben Cheikh
- Deputy: Hatem Sammoud
- Coach ladies Seniors: Lassad Mahfoudh
- Deputy: Seif Ksila
