= 2015 FIVB Volleyball Men's World Cup squads =

This article shows the rosters of all participating teams at the 2015 FIVB Volleyball Men's World Cup in Japan.

== Argentina ==
The following is the Argentine roster in the 2015 FIVB Volleyball Men's World Cup.

Head coach: Julio Velasco

No.	Name	Date of birth	Height	Weight	Spike	Block	2015 club
1	Pablo Guzman	6 April 1988	1.93 m (6 ft 4 in)	94 kg (207 lb)	350 cm (140 in)	335 cm (132 in)	(Argentina) Boca Rio Uruguay Seg.
4	Sebastián Garrocq	27 November 1979	1.70 m (5 ft 7 in)	63 kg (139 lb)	320 cm (130 in)	302 cm (119 in)	(Argentina) UPCN San Juan Volley
5	Nicolás Uriarte	21 March 1990	1.92 m (6 ft 4 in)	82 kg (181 lb)	346 cm (136 in)	326 cm (128 in)	(Poland) PGE Skra Bełchatów
6	Cristian Poglajen	14 July 1989	1.95 m (6 ft 5 in)	93 kg (205 lb)	346 cm (136 in)	320 cm (130 in)	(Brazil) Montes Claros Vôlei
7	Facundo Conte	25 August 1989	1.98 m (6 ft 6 in)	90 kg (200 lb)	350 cm (140 in)	326 cm (128 in)	(Poland) PGE Skra Bełchatów
11	Sebastián Solé	12 June 1991	2.02 m (6 ft 8 in)	88 kg (194 lb)	350 cm (140 in)	328 cm (129 in)	(Italy) Energy T.I. Diatec Trentino
12	Federico Martina	2 November 1992	2.02 m (6 ft 8 in)	92 kg (203 lb)	350 cm (140 in)	320 cm (130 in)	(Argentina) Ciudad de Buenos Aires
14	Pablo Crer	12 June 1989	2.05 m (6 ft 9 in)	78 kg (172 lb)	350 cm (140 in)	330 cm (130 in)	(Argentina) Personal Bolivar
15	Luciano De Cecco (c)	2 June 1988	1.94 m (6 ft 4 in)	89 kg (196 lb)	333 cm (131 in)	315 cm (124 in)	(Italy) Sir Safety Perugia
16	Martín Ramos	26 August 1991	1.97 m (6 ft 6 in)	95 kg (209 lb)	340 cm (130 in)	315 cm (124 in)	(Argentina) UPCN San Juan Volley
17	Luciano Zornetta	6 March 1993	1.82 m (6 ft 0 in)	70 kg (150 lb)	342 cm (135 in)	312 cm (123 in)	(Argentina) Boca Rio Uruguay Seg.
18	Ezequiel Palacios	2 October 1992	2.02 m (6 ft 8 in)	89 kg (196 lb)	352 cm (139 in)	314 cm (124 in)	(Argentina) La Union de Formosa Club
19	Maximiliano Gauna	29 April 1989	1.97 m (6 ft 6 in)	93 kg (205 lb)	338 cm (133 in)	320 cm (130 in)	(Germany) Friedrichshafen Club
20	Sebastián Closter	13 May 1989	1.80 m (5 ft 11 in)	66 kg (146 lb)	296 cm (117 in)	278 cm (109 in)	(Argentina) Gigantes del Sur

== Australia ==
The following is the Australian roster in the 2015 FIVB Volleyball Men's World Cup.

Head coach: (Australia) Roberto Santilli

No.	Name	Date of birth	Height	Weight	Spike	Block	2015 club
2	Jacob Ross Guymer	21 June 1993	2.03 m (6 ft 8 in)	100 kg (220 lb)	350 cm (140 in)	339 cm (133 in)	(Sweden) Örkelljunga VK
5	Travis Passier	26 April 1989	2.06 m (6 ft 9 in)	99 kg (218 lb)	351 cm (138 in)	340 cm (130 in)	(Australia) Australian Institute of Sport
6	Thomas Edgar (c)	21 June 1989	2.12 m (6 ft 11 in)	106 kg (234 lb)	357 cm (141 in)	341 cm (134 in)	(South Korea) LIG Insurance Greaters
7	Harrison Peacock	31 January 1991	1.92 m (6 ft 4 in)	87 kg (192 lb)	353 cm (139 in)	339 cm (133 in)	(Australia) Australian Institute of Sport
8	Jacques Borgeaud	19 June 1991	1.78 m (5 ft 10 in)	70 kg (150 lb)	321 cm (126 in)	310 cm (120 in)	(Canada) University of Regina
9	Max Staples	27 July 1994	1.94 m (6 ft 4 in)	83 kg (183 lb)	358 cm (141 in)	345 cm (136 in)	(Netherlands) Fusion Rotterdam
11	Luke Perry	20 November 1995	1.80 m (5 ft 11 in)	75 kg (165 lb)	330 cm (130 in)	315 cm (124 in)	(Finland) Team Lakkapaa
12	Nehemiah Mote	21 June 1993	2.04 m (6 ft 8 in)	91 kg (201 lb)	362 cm (143 in)	354 cm (139 in)	(Germany) TV Bühl
13	Samuel Walker	19 February 1995	2.08 m (6 ft 10 in)	90 kg (200 lb)	350 cm (140 in)	337 cm (133 in)	(Italy) Corigliano Volley
14	Grigory Sukochev	18 February 1988	1.96 m (6 ft 5 in)	86 kg (190 lb)	340 cm (130 in)	329 cm (130 in)	(Lebanon) Tannourine Club
15	Thomas Douglas-Powell	16 September 1992	1.94 m (6 ft 4 in)	82 kg (181 lb)	356 cm (140 in)	332 cm (131 in)	(Canada) University of Winnipeg
16	Jordan Richards	25 September 1993	1.93 m (6 ft 4 in)	80 kg (180 lb)	354 cm (139 in)	342 cm (135 in)	(Germany) TV Schonenwerd
17	Paul Carroll	16 May 1986	2.07 m (6 ft 9 in)	98 kg (216 lb)	354 cm (139 in)	340 cm (130 in)	(Germany) Berlin Recycling Volleys
19	Thomas Hodges	4 July 1994	1.97 m (6 ft 6 in)	95 kg (209 lb)	350 cm (140 in)	338 cm (133 in)	(United States) UC Irvine

== Canada ==
The following is the Canadian roster in the 2015 FIVB Volleyball Men's World Cup.

Head coach: Glenn Hoag

No.	Name	Date of birth	Height	Weight	Spike	Block	2015 club
1	TJ Sanders	14 December 1991	1.91 m (6 ft 3 in)	81 kg (179 lb)	326 cm (128 in)	308 cm (121 in)	(Switzerland) PV Lugano
2	John Gordon Perrin	17 August 1989	2.01 m (6 ft 7 in)	95 kg (209 lb)	353 cm (139 in)	329 cm (130 in)	(Brazil) Funvic Taubaté
3	Daniel Lewis	3 April 1976	1.89 m (6 ft 2 in)	86 kg (190 lb)	340 cm (130 in)	325 cm (128 in)	(France) Rennes
5	Rudy Verhoeff	24 June 1989	1.98 m (6 ft 6 in)	88 kg (194 lb)	349 cm (137 in)	317 cm (125 in)	(France) GFC Ajaccio
6	Justin Duff	10 May 1988	2.02 m (6 ft 8 in)	94 kg (207 lb)	370 cm (150 in)	335 cm (132 in)	(Poland) Transfer Bydgoszcz
9	Dustin Schneider	27 February 1985	1.82 m (6 ft 0 in)	82 kg (181 lb)	322 cm (127 in)	297 cm (117 in)	Team Canada
10	Toontje Van Lankvelt	1 July 1984	1.97 m (6 ft 6 in)	91 kg (201 lb)	347 cm (137 in)	317 cm (125 in)	(France) ASUL Lyon Volley-Ball
11	Daniel Jansen Vandoorn	21 March 1990	2.07 m (6 ft 9 in)	98 kg (216 lb)	351 cm (138 in)	328 cm (129 in)	(France) SAEMS Tourcoing VB
12	Gavin Schmitt	27 January 1986	2.08 m (6 ft 10 in)	106 kg (234 lb)	372 cm (146 in)	340 cm (130 in)	(Brazil) Funvic Taubaté
15	Frederic Winters	25 September 1982	1.95 m (6 ft 5 in)	98 kg (216 lb)	359 cm (141 in)	327 cm (129 in)	(Brazil) Sada Cruisero Volei
17	Graham Vigrass	17 June 1989	2.05 m (6 ft 9 in)	97 kg (214 lb)	354 cm (139 in)	330 cm (130 in)	(Tunisia) Etoile Sportive du Sahel
18	Nicholas Hoag	19 August 1992	2.00 m (6 ft 7 in)	91 kg (201 lb)	342 cm (135 in)	322 cm (127 in)	(France) Tours VB
19	Blair Cameron Bann	26 February 1988	1.84 m (6 ft 0 in)	84 kg (185 lb)	314 cm (124 in)	295 cm (116 in)	(Germany) Swd Powervolleys Duren
22	Steven Marshall	23 November 1989	1.89 m (6 ft 2 in)	79 kg (174 lb)	350 cm (140 in)	322 cm (127 in)	(Poland) Transfer Bydgoszcz

== Egypt ==
The following is the Egyptian roster in the 2015 FIVB Volleyball Men's World Cup.

Head coach: Nehad Shehata

No.	Name	Date of birth	Height	Weight	Spike	Block	2014 club
2	Abdalsalam Abdallah	10 October 1983	2.02 m (6 ft 8 in)	85 kg (187 lb)	346 cm (136 in)	330 cm (130 in)	(Egypt) Al Army
3	Abd Elhalim	3 June 1989	2.10 m (6 ft 11 in)	88 kg (194 lb)	285 cm (112 in)	270 cm (110 in)	(Egypt) Al Ahly
4	Ahmed Abdelhay (C)	19 August 1984	1.97 m (6 ft 6 in)	87 kg (192 lb)	342 cm (135 in)	316 cm (124 in)	(Egypt) Al Army
5	Abdellatif Ahmed	13 August 1983	2.02 m (6 ft 8 in)	90 kg (200 lb)	345 cm (136 in)	325 cm (128 in)	(Egypt) Zamalek
6	Mamdouh Abdelrehim	5 August 1989	2.07 m (6 ft 9 in)	90 kg (200 lb)	338 cm (133 in)	325 cm (128 in)	(Egypt) Al Army
8	Mohamed Thakil	12 July 1986	1.84 m (6 ft 0 in)	71 kg (157 lb)	326 cm (128 in)	315 cm (124 in)	(Egypt) Al Army
12	Hossam Abdalla	16 February 1988	2.03 m (6 ft 8 in)	97 kg (214 lb)	343 cm (135 in)	321 cm (126 in)	(Egypt) Al Ahly
13	Mohamed Badawy	11 January 1986	1.97 m (6 ft 6 in)	97 kg (214 lb)	351 cm (138 in)	343 cm (135 in)	(Egypt) Zamalek
14	Omar Hassan	4 April 1991	1.91 m (6 ft 3 in)	104 kg (229 lb)	333 cm (131 in)	324 cm (128 in)	(Egypt) Al Army
15	Ahmed Elkotb	23 July 1991	1.97 m (6 ft 6 in)	80 kg (180 lb)	328 cm (129 in)	318 cm (125 in)	(Egypt) Al Ahly
16	Mohamed Hassan	28 September 1993	1.93 m (6 ft 4 in)	76 kg (168 lb)	319 cm (126 in)	302 cm (119 in)	(Egypt) Zamalek
19	Mohamed Moawad	26 August 1987	1.94 m (6 ft 4 in)	90 kg (200 lb)	321 cm (126 in)	310 cm (120 in)	(Egypt) Al Ahly
20	Ahmed Shafik	7 December 1994	1.90 m (6 ft 3 in)	97 kg (214 lb)	349 cm (137 in)	323 cm (127 in)	(Egypt) Eastern Company

== Iran ==
The following is the Iranian roster in the 2015 FIVB Volleyball Men's World Cup.

Head coach: (Iran) Slobodan Kovac

No.	Name	Date of birth	Height	Weight	Spike	Block	2015 club
1	Shahram Mahmoudi	20 July 1988	1.98 m (6 ft 6 in)	95 kg (209 lb)	347 cm (137 in)	332 cm (131 in)	(Iran) Shahrdari Urmia
2	Milad Ebadipour	17 October 1993	1.96 m (6 ft 5 in)	78 kg (172 lb)	350 cm (140 in)	310 cm (120 in)	(Iran) Shahrdari Urmia
3	Saman Faezi	23 August 1991	2.04 m (6 ft 8 in)	87 kg (192 lb)	343 cm (135 in)	335 cm (132 in)	(Iran) Paykan Tehran
4	Saeid Marouf (C)	20 October 1985	1.89 m (6 ft 2 in)	81 kg (179 lb)	331 cm (130 in)	311 cm (122 in)	(Russia) Zenit Kazan
5	Farhad Ghaemi	28 August 1989	1.97 m (6 ft 6 in)	73 kg (161 lb)	355 cm (140 in)	335 cm (132 in)	(Iran) Paykan Tehran
6	Mohammad Mousavi	22 August 1987	2.03 m (6 ft 8 in)	86 kg (190 lb)	362 cm (143 in)	344 cm (135 in)	(Iran) Paykan Tehran
9	Adel Gholami	9 February 1986	1.95 m (6 ft 5 in)	88 kg (194 lb)	341 cm (134 in)	330 cm (130 in)	(Iran) Mizan Mashhad
10	Amir Ghafour	6 June 1991	2.02 m (6 ft 8 in)	90 kg (200 lb)	354 cm (139 in)	334 cm (131 in)	(Iran) Matin Varamin
12	Mojtaba Mirzajanpour	7 October 1991	2.05 m (6 ft 9 in)	88 kg (194 lb)	325 cm (128 in)	315 cm (124 in)	(Iran) Paykan Tehran
13	Mehdi Mahdavi	13 February 1984	1.91 m (6 ft 3 in)	96 kg (212 lb)	330 cm (130 in)	310 cm (120 in)	(Iran) Mizan Mashhad
16	Abdolreza Alizadeh	19 February 1987	1.83 m (6 ft 0 in)	80 kg (180 lb)	272 cm (107 in)	252 cm (99 in)	(Iran) Shahrdari Urmia
19	Mehdi Marandi	12 May 1986	1.72 m (5 ft 8 in)	69 kg (152 lb)	295 cm (116 in)	280 cm (110 in)	(Iran) Shahrdari Tabriz
22	Mohammad Hassan Senobar	11 July 1989	2.10 m (6 ft 11 in)	94 kg (207 lb)	370 cm (150 in)	361 cm (142 in)	(Iran) Shahrdari Tabriz
24	Mohammad Javad Manavinejad	27 November 1995	2.00 m (6 ft 7 in)	84 kg (185 lb)	340 cm (130 in)	320 cm (130 in)	(Iran) Paykan Tehran

== Italy ==
The following is the Italian roster in the 2015 FIVB Volleyball Men's World Cup.

Head coach: Gianlorenzo Blengini

No.	Name	Date of birth	Height	Weight	Spike	Block	2015 club
3	Daniele Sottile	17 August 1979	1.86 m (6 ft 1 in)	73 kg (161 lb)	332 cm (131 in)	310 cm (120 in)	(Italy) Power Volley
4	Luca Vettori	26 April 1991	2.00 m (6 ft 7 in)	95 kg (209 lb)	345 cm (136 in)	323 cm (127 in)	(Italy) Pallavolo Modena
5	Osmany Juantorena	12 August 1985	2.00 m (6 ft 7 in)	85 kg (187 lb)	370 cm (150 in)	340 cm (130 in)	(Turkey) Halkbank Ankara
6	Simone Giannelli	6 August 1996	1.98 m (6 ft 6 in)	92 kg (203 lb)	342 cm (135 in)	265 cm (104 in)	(Italy) Trentino Volley
7	Salvatore Rossini	13 July 1986	1.85 m (6 ft 1 in)	82 kg (181 lb)	312 cm (123 in)	301 cm (119 in)	(Italy) Pallavolo Modena
9	Ivan Zaytsev	2 October 1988	2.02 m (6 ft 8 in)	92 kg (203 lb)	355 cm (140 in)	348 cm (137 in)	(Russia) Dinamo Moscow
10	Filippo Lanza	3 March 1991	1.98 m (6 ft 6 in)	98 kg (216 lb)	350 cm (140 in)	330 cm (130 in)	(Italy) Trentino Volley
11	Simone Buti (C)	19 September 1983	2.06 m (6 ft 9 in)	100 kg (220 lb)	346 cm (136 in)	328 cm (129 in)	(Italy) Sir Safety Perugia
14	Matteo Piano	24 October 1990	2.08 m (6 ft 10 in)	102 kg (225 lb)	352 cm (139 in)	325 cm (128 in)	(Italy) Pallavolo Modena
16	Oleg Antonov	28 July 1988	1.98 m (6 ft 6 in)	88 kg (194 lb)	340 cm (130 in)	310 cm (120 in)	(France) Tours VB
18	Giulio Sabbi	10 August 1989	2.01 m (6 ft 7 in)	92 kg (203 lb)	352 cm (139 in)	325 cm (128 in)	(Italy) Lube Banca Macerata
19	Simone Anzani	24 February 1992	2.04 m (6 ft 8 in)	100 kg (220 lb)	350 cm (140 in)	330 cm (130 in)	(Italy) Blu Volley Verona
20	Massimo Colaci	21 February 1985	1.80 m (5 ft 11 in)	75 kg (165 lb)	324 cm (128 in)	308 cm (121 in)	(Italy) Trentino Volley
25	Jacopo Massari	2 June 1988	1.85 m (6 ft 1 in)	79 kg (174 lb)	328 cm (129 in)	310 cm (120 in)	(Italy) Copra Piacenza

== Japan ==
The following is the Japanese roster in the 2015 FIVB Volleyball Men's World Cup.

Head coach: Masashi Nambu

No.	Name	Date of birth	Height	Weight	Spike	Block	2015 club
1	Kunihiro Shimizu (C)	11 August 1986	1.92 m (6 ft 4 in)	97 kg (214 lb)	345 cm (136 in)	335 cm (132 in)	(Japan) Panasonic Panthers
2	Daisuke Sakai	22 October 1981	1.80 m (5 ft 11 in)	75 kg (165 lb)	320 cm (130 in)	305 cm (120 in)	(Japan) Suntory Sunbirds
3	Kentaro Takahashi	8 February 1995	2.00 m (6 ft 7 in)	93 kg (205 lb)	345 cm (136 in)	330 cm (130 in)	(Japan) University of Tsukuba
5	Yoshifumi Suzuki	31 March 1983	2.00 m (6 ft 7 in)	93 kg (205 lb)	340 cm (130 in)	300 cm (120 in)	(Japan) Suntory Sunbirds
8	Yūki Ishikawa	11 December 1995	1.91 m (6 ft 3 in)	75 kg (165 lb)	345 cm (136 in)	330 cm (130 in)	(Japan) Chuo University
9	Yuta Abe	8 August 1981	1.91 m (6 ft 3 in)	85 kg (187 lb)	342 cm (135 in)	320 cm (130 in)	(Japan) Suntory Sunbirds
10	Daisuke Yako	7 October 1988	1.94 m (6 ft 4 in)	89 kg (196 lb)	335 cm (132 in)	325 cm (128 in)	(Japan) JT Thunders
12	Akihiro Yamaguchi	30 November 1993	2.04 m (6 ft 8 in)	72 kg (159 lb)	348 cm (137 in)	328 cm (129 in)	(Japan) Aichi Gakuin University
13	Hideomi Fukatsu	1 June 1990	1.80 m (5 ft 11 in)	70 kg (150 lb)	330 cm (130 in)	305 cm (120 in)	(Japan) Panasonic Panthers
15	Masahiro Yanagida	6 July 1992	1.86 m (6 ft 1 in)	78 kg (172 lb)	335 cm (132 in)	305 cm (120 in)	(Japan) Suntory Sunbirds
16	Takashi Dekita	13 August 1991	1.99 m (6 ft 6 in)	90 kg (200 lb)	350 cm (140 in)	330 cm (130 in)	(Japan) Sakai Blazers
17	Takeshi Nagano	11 July 1985	1.76 m (5 ft 9 in)	69 kg (152 lb)	315 cm (124 in)	300 cm (120 in)	(Japan) Panasonic Panthers
18	Yuta Yoneyama	29 August 1984	1.85 m (6 ft 1 in)	85 kg (187 lb)	340 cm (130 in)	320 cm (130 in)	(Japan) Toray Arrows
19	Hiroaki Asano	6 October 1990	1.78 m (5 ft 10 in)	69 kg (152 lb)	335 cm (132 in)	315 cm (124 in)	(Japan) JTEKT Stings

== Poland ==
The following is the Polish roster in the 2015 FIVB Volleyball Men's World Cup.

Head coach: (Poland) Stephane Antiga

No.	Name	Date of birth	Height	Weight	Spike	Block	2015 club
1	Piotr Nowakowski	18 December 1987	2.05 m (6 ft 9 in)	90 kg (200 lb)	355 cm (140 in)	340 cm (130 in)	(Poland) Asseco Resovia Rzeszów
3	Dawid Konarski	31 August 1989	1.98 m (6 ft 6 in)	101 kg (223 lb)	353 cm (139 in)	335 cm (132 in)	(Poland) Asseco Resovia Rzeszów
6	Bartosz Kurek	29 August 1988	2.07 m (6 ft 9 in)	104 kg (229 lb)	375 cm (148 in)	340 cm (130 in)	(Italy) Cucine Lube Treia
7	Karol Kłos	8 August 1989	2.01 m (6 ft 7 in)	83 kg (183 lb)	357 cm (141 in)	326 cm (128 in)	(Poland) PGE Skra Bełchatów
11	Fabian Drzyzga	3 January 1990	1.96 m (6 ft 5 in)	90 kg (200 lb)	325 cm (128 in)	304 cm (120 in)	(Poland) Asseco Resovia Rzeszów
12	Grzegorz Łomacz	1 October 1987	1.87 m (6 ft 2 in)	81 kg (179 lb)	336 cm (132 in)	309 cm (122 in)	(Poland) MKS Cuprum Lubin
13	Michał Kubiak (C)	23 February 1988	1.91 m (6 ft 3 in)	80 kg (180 lb)	328 cm (129 in)	312 cm (123 in)	(Turkey) Halkbank Ankara
15	Piotr Gacek	16 September 1978	1.85 m (6 ft 1 in)	80 kg (180 lb)	328 cm (129 in)	305 cm (120 in)	(Poland) Lotos Trefl Gdańsk
17	Paweł Zatorski	21 June 1990	1.84 m (6 ft 0 in)	73 kg (161 lb)	328 cm (129 in)	304 cm (120 in)	(Poland) ZAKSA Kędzierzyn-Koźle
18	Marcin Możdżonek	9 February 1985	2.11 m (6 ft 11 in)	93 kg (205 lb)	358 cm (141 in)	338 cm (133 in)	(Turkey) Halkbank Ankara
20	Mateusz Mika	21 January 1991	2.06 m (6 ft 9 in)	86 kg (190 lb)	352 cm (139 in)	320 cm (130 in)	(Poland) Lotos Trefl Gdańsk
21	Rafał Buszek	28 April 1987	1.94 m (6 ft 4 in)	81 kg (179 lb)	345 cm (136 in)	327 cm (129 in)	(Poland) Asseco Resovia Rzeszów
23	Mateusz Bieniek	5 April 1994	2.10 m (6 ft 11 in)	98 kg (216 lb)	351 cm (138 in)	329 cm (130 in)	(Poland) Effector Kielce
25	Artur Szalpuk	20 March 1995	2.02 m (6 ft 8 in)	92 kg (203 lb)	348 cm (137 in)	325 cm (128 in)	(Poland) AZS Politechnika Warszawska

== Russia ==
The following is the Russian roster in the 2015 FIVB Volleyball Men's World Cup.

Head coach: Vladimir Alekno

No.	Name	Date of birth	Height	Weight	Spike	Block	2015 club
1	Alexey Obmochaev	22 May 1989	1.88 m (6 ft 2 in)	80 kg (180 lb)	325 cm (128 in)	310 cm (120 in)	(Russia) VC Dynamo Moscow
4	Artem Volvich	22 January 1990	2.08 m (6 ft 10 in)	96 kg (212 lb)	350 cm (140 in)	330 cm (130 in)	(Russia) Lokomotiv Novosibirsk
5	Sergey Grankin	21 January 1985	1.95 m (6 ft 5 in)	96 kg (212 lb)	351 cm (138 in)	320 cm (130 in)	(Russia) VC Dynamo Moscow
6	Evgeny Sivozhelez	6 August 1986	1.96 m (6 ft 5 in)	90 kg (200 lb)	330 cm (130 in)	320 cm (130 in)	(Russia) VC Zenit Kazan
8	Sergey Tetyukhin	23 September 1975	1.97 m (6 ft 6 in)	89 kg (196 lb)	345 cm (136 in)	338 cm (133 in)	(Russia) Belogorie Belgorod
9	Aleksey Spiridonov	26 June 1988	1.96 m (6 ft 5 in)	96 kg (212 lb)	347 cm (137 in)	328 cm (129 in)	(Russia) VC Zenit Kazan
10	Alexander Ianutov	19 June 1983	1.95 m (6 ft 5 in)	81 kg (179 lb)	337 cm (133 in)	329 cm (130 in)	(Russia) Lokomotiv Novosibirsk
11	Ilia Vlasov	3 August 1995	2.12 m (6 ft 11 in)	98 kg (216 lb)	360 cm (140 in)	345 cm (136 in)	(Russia) Fakel Novy Urengoy
12	Alexander Butko	18 March 1986	1.98 m (6 ft 6 in)	97 kg (214 lb)	339 cm (133 in)	327 cm (129 in)	(Russia) Lokomotiv Novosibirsk
13	Dmitriy Muserskiy (C)	29 October 1988	2.18 m (7 ft 2 in)	104 kg (229 lb)	375 cm (148 in)	347 cm (137 in)	(Russia) Belogorie Belgorod
14	Victor Poletaev	27 July 1995	1.97 m (6 ft 6 in)	86 kg (190 lb)	360 cm (140 in)	340 cm (130 in)	(Russia) VC Zenit Kazan
15	Dmitriy Ilinykh	31 January 1987	2.01 m (6 ft 7 in)	92 kg (203 lb)	338 cm (133 in)	330 cm (130 in)	(Russia) Belogorie Belgorod
17	Maxim Mikhaylov	19 March 1988	2.02 m (6 ft 8 in)	103 kg (227 lb)	345 cm (136 in)	330 cm (130 in)	(Russia) VC Zenit Kazan
20	Ilyas Kurkaev	18 January 1994	2.07 m (6 ft 9 in)	95 kg (209 lb)	355 cm (140 in)	335 cm (132 in)	(Russia) Enisey

== Tunisia ==
The following is the Tunisian roster in the 2015 FIVB Volleyball Men's World Cup.

Head coach: Fathi Mkaouar

No.	Name	Date of birth	Height	Weight	Spike	Block	2015 club
1	Tayeb Korbosli	5 June 1993	1.88 m (6 ft 2 in)	75 kg (165 lb)	280 cm (110 in)	270 cm (110 in)	(Tunisia) CO Kelibia
3	Marouane M'rabet	5 June 1985	1.86 m (6 ft 1 in)	81 kg (179 lb)	315 cm (124 in)	296 cm (117 in)	(Tunisia) ES Sahel
4	Marouen Garci (C)	21 March 1988	1.97 m (6 ft 6 in)	87 kg (192 lb)	317 cm (125 in)	308 cm (121 in)	(Tunisia) ES Sahel
6	Mohamed Ali Ben Othmen Miladi	12 May 1991	1.88 m (6 ft 2 in)	73 kg (161 lb)	315 cm (124 in)	289 cm (114 in)	(Tunisia) ES Tunis
7	Elyes Karamosli	22 August 1989	1.98 m (6 ft 6 in)	99 kg (218 lb)	345 cm (136 in)	320 cm (130 in)	(Tunisia) ES Tunis
8	Nabil Miladi	28 February 1988	1.96 m (6 ft 5 in)	73 kg (161 lb)	355 cm (140 in)	340 cm (130 in)	(Tunisia) ES Tunis
10	Hamza Nagga	29 May 1990	1.91 m (6 ft 3 in)	84 kg (185 lb)	326 cm (128 in)	311 cm (122 in)	(Tunisia) ES Sahel
11	Ismail Moalla	30 January 1990	1.95 m (6 ft 5 in)	84 kg (185 lb)	324 cm (128 in)	308 cm (121 in)	(Tunisia) CS Sfaxien
13	Haykel Jerbi	4 April 1988	1.99 m (6 ft 6 in)	81 kg (179 lb)	280 cm (110 in)	290 cm (110 in)	(Tunisia) ES Sahel
15	Hichem Kaabi	13 September 1986	1.94 m (6 ft 4 in)	84 kg (185 lb)	360 cm (140 in)	345 cm (136 in)	(Tunisia) ES Tunis
19	Skander Ben Tara	22 January 1985	2.05 m (6 ft 9 in)	102 kg (225 lb)	355 cm (140 in)	345 cm (136 in)	(Tunisia) ES Tunis
20	Omar Agrebi	26 August 1992	2.05 m (6 ft 9 in)	82 kg (181 lb)	325 cm (128 in)	310 cm (120 in)	(Tunisia) CS Sfaxien

== United States ==
The following is the United States roster in the 2015 FIVB Volleyball Men's World Cup.

Head coach: (United States) John Speraw

No.	Name	Date of birth	Height	Weight	Spike	Block	2015 club
1	Matthew Anderson	18 April 1987	2.02 m (6 ft 8 in)	100 kg (220 lb)	360 cm (140 in)	332 cm (131 in)	(Russia) Zenit Kazan
2	Aaron Russell	4 June 1993	2.05 m (6 ft 9 in)	98 kg (216 lb)	356 cm (140 in)	337 cm (133 in)	(United States) Pennsylvania State University
3	Taylor Sander	17 March 1992	1.96 m (6 ft 5 in)	80 kg (180 lb)	345 cm (136 in)	320 cm (130 in)	(Italy) Blu Volley Verona
4	David Lee	8 March 1982	2.03 m (6 ft 8 in)	105 kg (231 lb)	350 cm (140 in)	325 cm (128 in)	(Russia) Lokomotiv Novosibirsk
6	Paul Lotman	3 November 1985	2 m (6 ft 7 in)	102 kg (225 lb)	336 cm (132 in)	312 cm (123 in)	(Poland) Asseco Resovia Rzeszów
7	Kawika Shoji	11 November 1987	1.9 m (6 ft 3 in)	79 kg (174 lb)	331 cm (130 in)	315 cm (124 in)	(Germany) Berlin Recycling Volleys
9	Murphy Troy	31 May 1989	2.02 m (6 ft 8 in)	99 kg (218 lb)	360 cm (140 in)	350 cm (140 in)	(Poland) Lotos Trefl Gdańsk
11	Micah Christenson	8 June 1993	1.98 m (6 ft 6 in)	88 kg (194 lb)	349 cm (137 in)	340 cm (130 in)	(United States) University of Southern California
12	Russell Holmes	1 July 1982	2.05 m (6 ft 9 in)	95 kg (209 lb)	352 cm (139 in)	335 cm (132 in)	(Poland) Asseco Resovia Rzeszów
16	Jayson Jablonsky	23 July 1985	1.98 m (6 ft 6 in)	91 kg (201 lb)	345 cm (136 in)	335 cm (132 in)	(China) Fujian
17	Maxwell Holt	12 March 1987	2.05 m (6 ft 9 in)	90 kg (200 lb)	351 cm (138 in)	333 cm (131 in)	(Russia) Dynamo Moscow
20	David Smith	15 May 1985	2.01 m (6 ft 7 in)	86 kg (190 lb)	348 cm (137 in)	314 cm (124 in)	(France) Tours VB
21	Dustin Watten	27 October 1986	1.82 m (6 ft 0 in)	80 kg (180 lb)	306 cm (120 in)	295 cm (116 in)	(France) GFCO Ajaccio VB
22	Erik Shoji	24 August 1989	1.84 m (6 ft 0 in)	83 kg (183 lb)	330 cm (130 in)	321 cm (126 in)	(Germany) Berlin Recycling Volleys

== Venezuela ==
The following is the Venezuelan roster in the 2015 FIVB Volleyball Men's World Cup.

Head coach: (Venezuela) Vincenzo Nacchi

No.	Name	Date of birth	Height	Weight	Spike	Block	2015 club
1	Jhonlen Barreto	14 May 1987	1.85 m (6 ft 1 in)	80 kg (180 lb)	340 cm (130 in)	325 cm (128 in)	
3	Fernando González	30 June 1989	1.94 m (6 ft 4 in)	84 kg (185 lb)	333 cm (131 in)	328 cm (129 in)	(Argentina) Chubut Voley
4	Héctor Mata	27 January 1993	1.79 m (5 ft 10 in)	77 kg (170 lb)	310 cm (120 in)	304 cm (120 in)	(Venezuela) Deportivo Anzoátegui
5	Emerson Rodríguez	2 February 1993	2.02 m (6 ft 8 in)	90 kg (200 lb)	338 cm (133 in)	333 cm (131 in)	(Venezuela) Distrito Capital
7	Edson Valencia	2 December 1987	2.00 m (6 ft 7 in)	80 kg (180 lb)	330 cm (130 in)	325 cm (128 in)	(Venezuela) Huracanes
9	José Carrasco	20 May 1989	1.95 m (6 ft 5 in)	89 kg (196 lb)	345 cm (136 in)	347 cm (137 in)	(Venezuela) Yaracuy
10	Kervin Piñerua (C)	22 February 1991	1.91 m (6 ft 3 in)	85 kg (187 lb)	339 cm (133 in)	334 cm (131 in)	(Venezuela) Vikingos de Miranda
11	Jhoser Contreras	4 April 1991	1.91 m (6 ft 3 in)	84 kg (185 lb)	340 cm (130 in)	334 cm (131 in)	(Venezuela) Zulia
12	Angel Petit	18 February 1983	1.90 m (6 ft 3 in)	72 kg (159 lb)	338 cm (133 in)	332 cm (131 in)	(Venezuela) Zulia
14	Máximo Montoya	26 June 1989	1.98 m (6 ft 6 in)	86 kg (190 lb)	347 cm (137 in)	343 cm (135 in)	(Venezuela) Apure
18	Jonathan Quijada	25 September 1995	2.03 m (6 ft 8 in)	82 kg (181 lb)	346 cm (136 in)	341 cm (134 in)	(Venezuela) Aragua
19	Willner Rivas	2 April 1995	1.94 m (6 ft 4 in)	81 kg (179 lb)	339 cm (133 in)	336 cm (132 in)	(Venezuela) Distrito Capital
20	Oscar Garcia	16 September 1995	1.68 m (5 ft 6 in)	76 kg (168 lb)	320 cm (130 in)	315 cm (124 in)	(Venezuela) Barinas
23	Iván Márquez	4 October 1981	2.05 m (6 ft 9 in)	90 kg (200 lb)	372 cm (146 in)	367 cm (144 in)	(Italy) Pallavolo Pineto

== See also ==
- 2015 FIVB Volleyball Women's World Cup squads
