= Venezuela at the 2020 Summer Olympics =

- IOC code: VEN
- NOC: Venezuelan Olympic Committee
- Website: cov.com.ve (in Spanish)

in Tokyo, Japan July 23, 2021 – August 8, 2021
- Competitors: 44 in 14 sports
- Flag bearer (opening): Antonio Díaz (Note: See #Opening ceremony; in an interview with Inside the Games after the opening ceremony, Díaz was named as the nation's only opening ceremony flagbearer.)
- Flag bearer (closing): Antonio Díaz
- Medals Ranked 46th: Gold 1 Silver 3 Bronze 0 Total 4

Summer Olympics appearances (overview)
- 1948; 1952; 1956; 1960; 1964; 1968; 1972; 1976; 1980; 1984; 1988; 1992; 1996; 2000; 2004; 2008; 2012; 2016; 2020; 2024; 2028

Venezuela competed at the 2020 Summer Olympics in Tokyo. Originally scheduled to take place from 24 July to 9 August 2020, the Games were postponed to 23 July to 8 August 2021, due to the COVID-19 pandemic. It was the nation's nineteenth consecutive appearance at the Summer Olympics.

With four medals, including a gold, the 2020 Games was Venezuela's best performance in its participation history. Triple jumper Yulimar Rojas broke the women's world record with a 15.67 m (51 ft 4 3/4 in) jump. Veteran freestyle BMX cyclist Daniel Dhers, who helped get the sport into the Olympic Games, took a silver medal in the event at its debut. Another two silver medals were won in weightlifting categories, by Julio Mayora and Keydomar Vallenilla; all Venezuela's weightlifters achieved top eight finishes.

Though road cyclist Orluis Aular led for much of his race, he had to retire shortly before the end. Venezuelan boxing and fencing under-performed, with 2016 boxing silver medalist Yoel Finol and 2012 fencing gold medalist Rubén Limardo both losing their first matches.

== Administration ==
In 2019, Venezuelan Olympic Committee (COV) president Eduardo Álvarez set the nation's 2020 Summer Olympics targets. They aimed to have between 60 and 70 athletes competing, and to win 20 Olympic diplomas (awarded to the top 8 in each event).

The COV also co-hosted the karate referee training course in 2019, in anticipation of the sport premiering at the 2020 Games and following new rules being implemented in both kata and kumite disciplines. In July 2020, the COV formed a working group to re-organize the Americas boxing qualifying event, which had been due to be held in Buenos Aires, Argentina, earlier that year but was cancelled due to COVID-19 pandemic event restrictions.

In December 2020, the COV held X Session, which "aims to reinforce Olympic values." The COV and Venezuelan Olympic Academy have held X Sessions in previous years, usually taking place over three days. The 2020 event was condensed to one day to limit social interaction during the COVID-19 pandemic. It was attended, either in-person or virtually, by delegates from around the world. The matters of Olympism, particularly anti-doping in sports, were discussed in presentations to spread sport education.

During the ongoing crisis in Venezuela, the COV has suffered financially. The Venezuelan boxer Eldric Sella, who had asylum in Trinidad and Tobago, competed at the 2020 Games with the Refugee Olympic Team. He had been dropped from the Venezuelan team in 2014 due to lack of resources, and left the country in 2018. Despite not competing for Venezuela, and going out in his first match, his perseverance to make it to the Olympics while living as a refugee was said to be inspiring to his compatriots, many of whom are also refugees abroad.

== Medalists ==
In terms of medals, the 2020 Games was Venezuela's best performance in its participation history, receiving one gold and three silver medals, as well as six diplomas. In Venezuela, controversy arose over statements made by the medalists in supervised calls to president Nicolás Maduro. Political scientists have noted that the Venezuelan government used Olympic success as a form of propaganda.

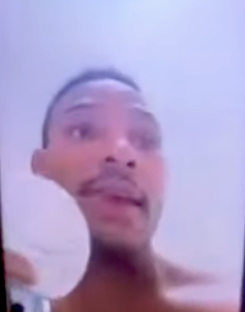
Julio Mayora holding his silver medal

Venezuela's first medal of the Games was won by weightlifter Julio Mayora on 28 July, taking the silver medal in the men's 73 kg category and dedicating it to late president Hugo Chávez, who had been born on 28 July. Noticiero Digital reported that in the video featuring the dedication to Chávez, Venezuelan Youth and Sport Minister Mervin Maldonado can be heard in the background instructing Mayora to say it. Mayora's silver is Venezuela's second weightlifting medal after Israel Rubio's bronze at Athens 2004. The Caracas Chronicles reported that Mayora, who still lives in Venezuela though trains in the Dominican Republic, told friends that the best part about winning the medal is that he can now claim a better house for his mother from the government.

Mayora was attacked on social media in Venezuela for the dedication. The next day, president Nicolás Maduro took to national television to defend Mayora as a patriot and say that the nation's sporting "generation of gold" started with Chávez. El Pitazo interviewed Venezuelan Olympic cyclist Daniel Dhers about the controversy, with Dhers saying that regardless of politics, everyone is at the Games for Venezuela. Prior to the controversy, Juan Guaidó had congratulated Mayora on the win. Caracas Chronicles condemned how quickly people turned from praising a medalist to hating him because of the video, while El País noted that outside of the Twitter vitriol Mayora's dedication was "generally tolerated and understood".

On 31 July, Keydomar Vallenilla took another weightlifting silver medal, in the men's 96 kg category, and on 1 August, Daniel Dhers won the men's BMX freestyle silver medal, in its Olympic debut. Later in the day, Yulimar Rojas won the gold medal in women's triple jump. She is Venezuela's first female Olympic gold medalist, and also Venezuela's first athletics gold and third gold medal overall. It is Venezuela's third medal in the triple jump, following Rojas' silver at Rio 2016 and Asnoldo Devonish's bronze at Helsinki 1952, which was also Venezuela's first-ever Olympic medal.

Each of the medalists was obliged to speak with and thank Maduro under supervision of Venezuelan officials shortly after their wins, with the calls (which were filmed) shared on official channels in Venezuela. In Rojas' call, Maduro called her "the queen of Tokyo". He later shared a message on Twitter lauding the athlete: "warrior, you shine with your own light, you are a faithful reflection of the fighting spirit and greatness of the Venezuelan people." Guaidó also celebrated that she had literally gone further than anyone before. El Nacional noted that the athletes have faced criticism at home for praising Maduro in the calls. In an opinion column, it acknowledged the statements were "guided if not forced" and that the athletes would be concerned for family in Venezuela, but said that Krystsina Tsimanouskaya had more dignity in criticizing her nation.

Medal	Name	Sport	Event	Date
Gold	Yulimar Rojas	Athletics	Women's triple jump	August 1
Silver	Julio Mayora	Weightlifting	Men's 73 kg	July 28
Silver	Keydomar Vallenilla	Weightlifting	Men's 96 kg	July 31
Silver	Daniel Dhers	Cycling	Men's BMX freestyle	August 1

== Opening ceremony ==
Venezuela took part in the Parade of Nations, marching 160th in accordance with the Gojūon order, based on the names of countries in Japanese, with "Venezuela" rendered as "ベネズエラ". The delegation in the parade wore bright blue suits.

The flagbearers for Venezuela were chosen by popular vote, with one male and one female representative to be flagbearers: karateka Antonio Díaz and triple jumper Yulimar Rojas were selected. The voting program, called "Abanderado por el Pueblo" ("The People's Flagbearers"), was devised by the COV in May 2021. On 22 July 2021, the day before the opening ceremony, Rojas was still slated to be a flagbearer, but she did not appear at the ceremony. Judoka Karen León walked alongside Díaz at the opening ceremony, but did not carry the flag. Díaz was the only karateka flagbearer, and both he and Antonio Espinós, president of the World Karate Federation (WKF), felt proud to have a representative for the sport featured in the opening ceremony, with Espinós saying that the WKF "couldn't have asked for a better ambassador for karate".

== Closing ceremony ==
Venezuela also participated in the closing ceremony. As in the opening ceremony, they entered 160th, with Díaz as the flagbearer at this ceremony, too.

== Competitors ==
Forty-three Venezuelan athletes competed. After the Olympics, each was given a car by the Venezuelan government, presented at a celebration on 10 August 2021 when the delegation (excluding Rojas and Dhers) returned to Venezuela. After the athletes arrived at Maiquetía Airport they were paraded via open-top bus, decorated in the colors of the Venezuelan flag, to Miraflores Palace in Caracas.

Sport	Men	Women	Total
Athletics	0	4	4
Boxing	3	1	4
Cycling	2	0	2
Diving	1	0	1
Fencing	2	0	2
Golf	1	0	1
Judo	0	3	3
Karate	2	1	3
Rowing	2	0	2
Sailing	1	0	1
Shooting	1	0	1
Swimming	2	2	4
Volleyball	12	0	12
Weightlifting	2	2	4
Total	31	13	44

== Athletics ==
=== Field ===
Four women qualified to represent Venezuela at athletics events. The athletes achieved the entry standards, either by qualifying target or by world ranking.

Athlete	Event	Qualification		Final	
Athlete	Event	Distance	Position	Distance	Position
Robeilys Peinado	Women's pole vault	4.55	=1 q	4.50	=8
Yulimar Rojas	Women's triple jump	14.77	1 Q	15.67 WR	1st place, gold medalist(s)
Ahymara Espinoza	Women's shot put	17.17	25	Did not advance	
Rosa Rodríguez	Women's hammer throw	68.23	22	Did not advance	

Key

- Q = Qualified for the next round
- q = Qualified for the next round, in field events, by position without achieving the qualifying target

==== Women's pole vault ====
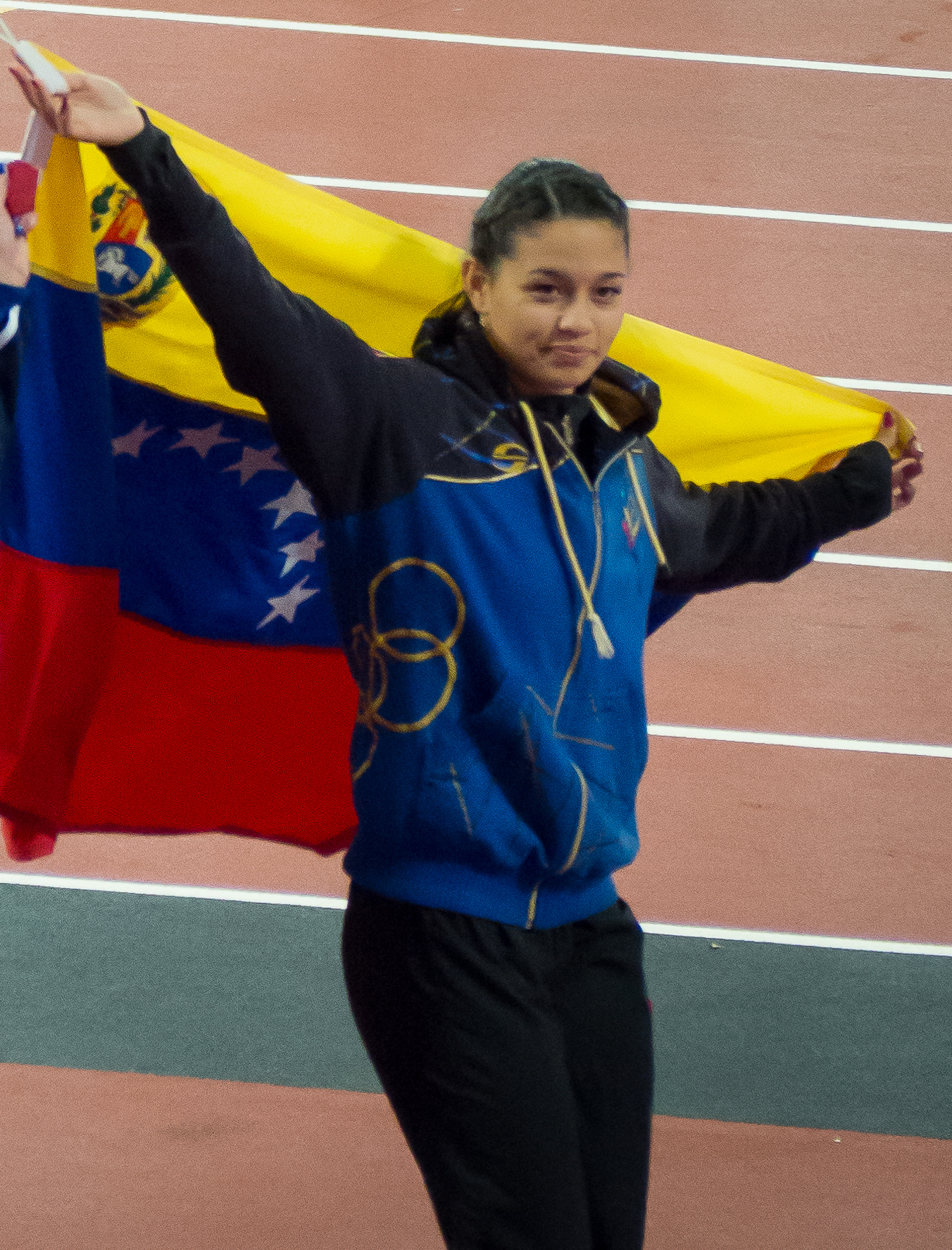
Peinado in 2017

Robeilys Peinado qualified for Venezuela in the pole vault. She won the silver medal at the 2014 Summer Youth Olympics, and was set to compete at the 2016 Summer Olympics but suffered an injury during practice jumps when her pole broke and she was unable to take part.

Qualification round
Rank	Group	4.25	4.40	4.55	Height	Notes
=1	A	—	o	o	4.55	q

Final
Rank	4.50	4.70	Height
=8	xo	xxx	4.50

At the 2020 Games, she took part in Group A in the qualification round on 2 August 2021, jumping 4.55 m (14 ft 11 in), a distance matched but not exceeded by fourteen other athletes across both qualifying groups, and they all qualified. Peinado jumped the height without making any faults, qualifying joint first with six other athletes. In the final on 5 August, she jumped fourth in each round and cleared 4.50 m (14 ft 9 in) on her second jump. She then failed to clear at 4.70 m (15 ft 5 in), placing joint eighth with four other athletes.

==== Women's triple jump ====
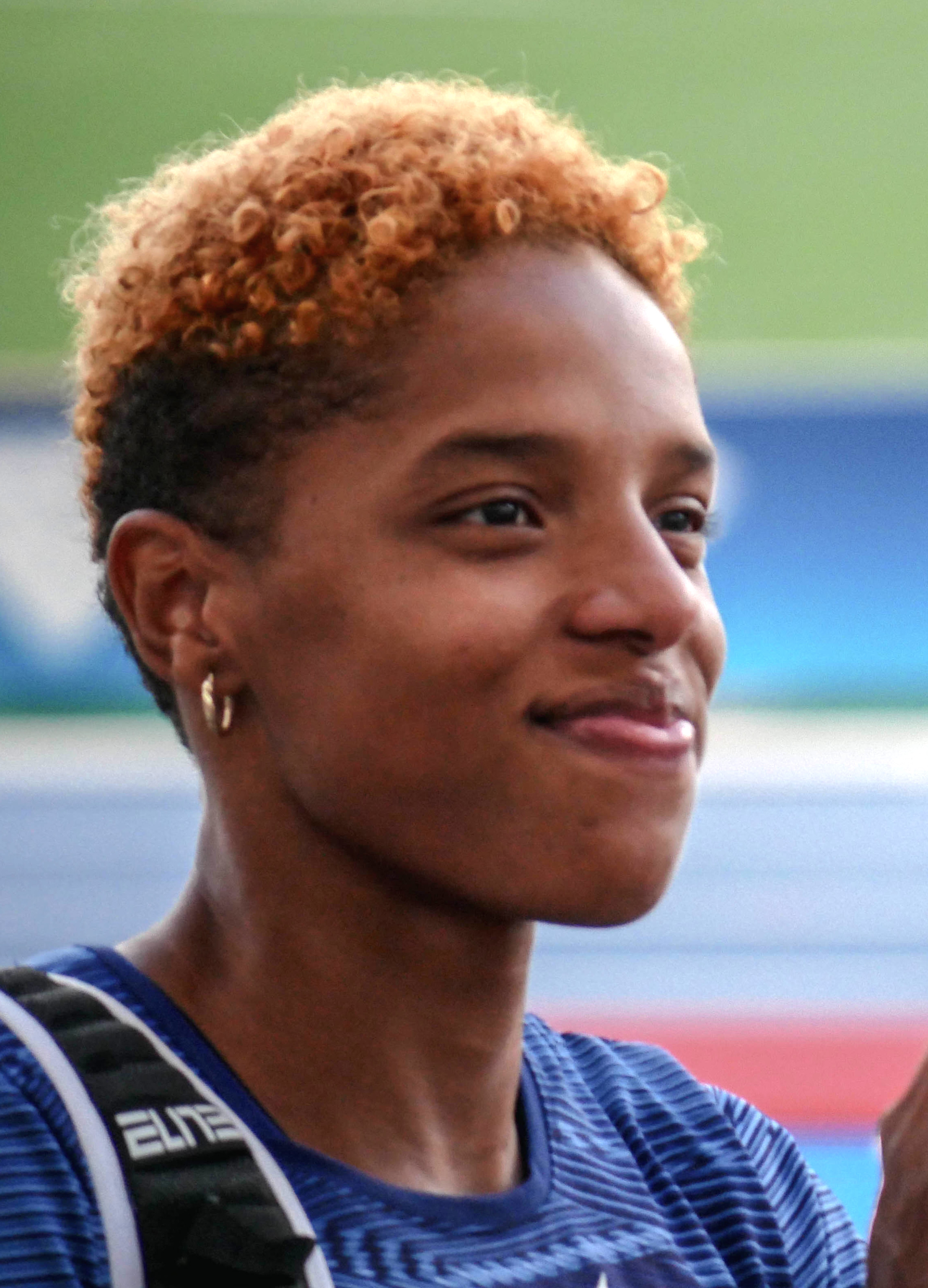
Yulimar Rojas broke the women's triple jump world record at the Games

Yulimar Rojas represented Venezuela in the triple jump, after winning the silver medal at the 2016 Games and setting a new indoor world record in 2020. She is regarded as one of the best athletes in the world, and was favorite to win the gold medal. She told Sport that she had been visualizing winning gold since Rio 2016.

Rojas could also have qualified for the long jump event, but did not contest it, with her coach Iván Pedroso saying her focus remained on the triple jump; Rojas later said that she had wanted to compete in the long jump in Tokyo, but the schedule of events prevented it. She had previously said she wanted to compete at the Games alongside her sister, Yerilda Zapata, who represents Venezuela in discus throw.

Final
Rank	1	2	3	4	5	6	Result	Notes
1st place, gold medalist(s)	15.41	14.53	x	15.25	x	15.67	15.67	WR, OR

She took part in Group A in the qualification round on 30 July. On her first attempt she jumped 14.77 m (48 ft 5 1/4 in); further than everyone else, she did not jump again and qualified for the finals in first. In the final held on 1 August, Rojas won the gold medal. She set a new Olympic record of 15.41 m (50 ft 6 1/2 in) with her first attempt. On her final attempt, she improved this to 15.67 m (51 ft 4 3/4 in) (5.86 m hop, 3.82 m skip, 5.99 m jump), also breaking the world record, which had previously been held by Inessa Kravets since 1995 with 15.50 m (50 ft 10 in).

==== Women's shot put ====
No Venezuelan athlete registered a shot put above the Olympic qualifying distance of 18.50 m (60 ft 8 1/4 in), but at the time of qualifying, Ahymara Espinoza was ranked 27 and so automatically gained a place at the Olympics. Espinoza had trained in Spain until she had to return to Venezuela to support her family financially, and later started a crowdfunding campaign to help her get to Tokyo.

In the women's shot put qualifying round held on 30 July at Japan National Stadium, athletes had to throw at least 18.80 m (61 ft 8 in) or be one of the 12 best throws (including tied for more than 12 athletes) to progress.

Qualification round
Rank	Group	1	2	3	Result	Notes
25	B	17.17	16.74	16.50	17.17	Did not advance

Ahymara Espinoza competed in qualifying group B, placing 12 in the group and 25 overall with a best throw of 17.17 m (56 ft 3 3/4 in), a worse performance than her Rio 2016 appearance. In 2021, she had previously thrown over 18 metres, though her best throw (Venezuela's national record) of 18.19 m (59 ft 8 in) would not have seen her advance. Despite not making it to the final, she told media she was happy to have been able to compete at the Olympics.

==== Women's hammer throw ====
Rosa Rodríguez automatically qualified for the women's hammer throw at the Games, both being a top-ranked athlete and meeting the qualifying distance, and was considered a possible medal contender. In the event, held on 1 August, athletes had to reach 73.50 m (241 ft 1 1/2 in) or have one of the 12 furthest throws to progress from the qualifying round to the final.

Qualification round
Rank	Group	1	2	3	Result	Notes
22	B	x	67.25	68.23	68.23	Did not advance

Rodríguez threw thirteenth in group B, by random designation, in the qualifying round, only managing 68.23 m (223 ft 10 in) to come eleventh in the group and twenty-second overall.

== Boxing ==
Venezuela qualified four boxers into the Olympic tournament. All of them qualified via their rankings after the 2021 Pan American Boxing Olympic Qualification Tournament, which was due to be held in Buenos Aires, Argentina, was cancelled. Prior to the Games, Gabriel Maestre, who was due to serve as the captain of the nation's boxing team, withdrew to focus on his professional boxing career.

The boxing events were held in Ryōgoku Kokugikan.

Athlete	Event	Round of 32	Round of 16	Quarterfinals	Semifinals	Final	
Athlete	Event	Opposition Result	Opposition Result	Opposition Result	Opposition Result	Opposition Result	Rank
Yoel Finol	Men's flyweight	Tanaka (JPN); L 0–5	did not advance				
Gabriel Maestre	Men's welterweight	Withdrew prior to Games					
Nalek Korbaj	Men's light heavyweight	Houmri (ALG); L 2-3	Did not advance				
Irismar Cardozo	Women's flyweight	Sorrentino (ITA); L 0–5	did not advance				

=== Men's flyweight ===
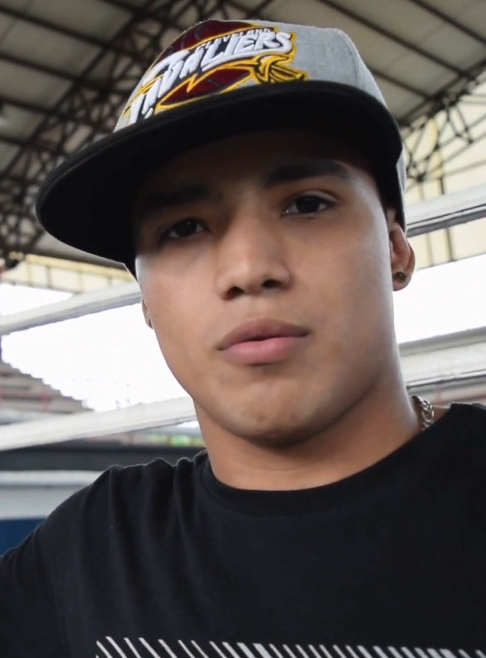
Yoel Finol in 2019

Yoel Finol, brother-in-law to the iconic late disgraced Venezuelan boxer Edwin Valero, was awarded the silver medal at Rio 2016 after originally winning the bronze when silver medalist Mikhail Aloyan was disqualified for doping. In the run-up to the Tokyo Games, in early 2021, Finol shared a statement to say that he forgave Valero for killing his sister, and wanted to move on "if only for his own peace of mind." He also expressed more optimism than he said he felt at the 2016 Games, as he had only just joined the national team then and in 2021 had more practice and technique.

He was uncertain if he would qualify for the 2020 Olympics, and his Olympiad had been disrupted. Due to the crisis in Venezuela, the boxing team were not given the resources to travel to major competitions, which negatively affected the rankings of its boxers. Finol took up professional boxing in 2019 to make money and continue competing. As the COVID-19 pandemic also saw the Americas qualifying boxing competition canceled, the Venezuelans could not prove themselves in the ring and had to rely on their rankings.

Round	Judge's score									
Round	Finol (VEN)					Tanaka (JPN)				
Round	1	2	3	4	5	1	2	3	4	5
1	9	9	9	10	9	10	10	10	9	10
2	9	9	9	9	9	10	10	10	10	10
3	10	9	10	9	9	9	10	9	10	10
Total	28	27	28	28	27	29	30	29	29	30

Finol represented Venezuela in the men's flyweight on 26 July, going out in the round of 32 after losing on points by unanimous decision to eventual bronze medal winner Ryomei Tanaka. The bout had to be stopped twice for Finol to tie his hair back as it got in the way. Speaking to the press after his loss, Finol said he wanted to apologize to the Venezuelan people for not doing better.

=== Men's light heavyweight ===
Nalek Korbaj, known as the "Rocky of Venezuela", due to his hometown of Philadelphia and his short stature for his weight class, won several medals in American tournaments in the Olympiad running-up to Tokyo 2020, qualifying for the Olympics in May 2021.

Round	Judge's score									
Round	Korbaj (VEN)					Houmri (ALG)				
Round	1	2	3	4	5	1	2	3	4	5
1	10	9	9	10	10	9	10	10	9	9
2	9	9	9	10	10	10	10	10	9	9
3	9	9	9	10	9	10	10	10	9	10
Total	28	27	27	30	29	29	30	30	27	28

Korbaj represented Venezuela in the men's light heavyweight on 25 July, going out in the round of 32 after losing on points 2–3 to Mohammed Houmri. The fight was competitive, reflected in the judges' scores being wildly divergent, some awarding full marks to one boxer and lowly ranking the other, and others vice versa.

=== Women's flyweight ===
Irismar Cardozo represented Venezuela in the women's flyweight. She qualified for the Olympics by drawing lots against Miguelina Hernández of the Dominican Republic; the two were tied in rankings and the International Olympic Committee (IOC) had exhausted other tie-breakers.

Round	Judge's score									
Round	Cardozo (VEN)					Sorrentino (ITA)				
Round	1	2	3	4	5	1	2	3	4	5
1	10	9	10	9	9	9	10	9	10	10
2	9	9	9	9	9	10	10	10	10	10
3	9	10	9	9	9	10	9	10	10	10
Total	28	28	28	27	27	29	29	29	30	30

Cardozo went out on 25 July in the round of 32 after losing on points by unanimous decision to Giordana Sorrentino.

== Cycling ==
=== Road ===
Athlete	Event	Time	Rank
Orluis Aular	Men's road race	did not finish	

==== Men's road race ====
Venezuela entered one rider, Orluis Aular, to compete in the men's Olympic road race, by virtue of his top 50 national finish (for men) in the UCI World Ranking. The race took place on 24 July 2021. Aular lives and trains in Spain, and was also the only representative for his road race team, Caja Rural.

The men's race started at Musashinonomori Park in Chōfu, western Tokyo, and finished at the Fuji Speedway circuit in the Shizuoka Prefecture. The race was 234 kilometres (145 mi) long with a total elevation gain of 4,865 metres (15,961 ft). The conditions were 30 °C (86 °F) and overcast. The course first passed through the mostly flat outskirts of Tokyo's metropolitan area before a gradual climb towards the foot of the climb to Doushi Road. After 80 kilometres (50 mi) the cyclists topped out at an altitude of 1,121 metres (3,678 ft) above sea level at Lake Yamanakako in Yamanashi, then crossed the Kagosaka Pass and began the descent. The race then headed towards the lower slopes of Mount Fuji, taking the Fuji Sanroku path before a long descent into Gotemba. Following the Fuji mountain pass, the riders headed towards the Fuji Speedway section, making two laps before reaching the foot of the Mikuni Pass for another climb and a return to Lake Yamanakako and the Kagosaka Pass before a final descent and a short hilly section towards the finish on the Fuji Speedway circuit.

Result
Rank	#	Time	Diff.
—	116	DNF	

As soon as the race started, a group of eight riders broke away from the peloton, including Aular. The break reached a maximum advantage of around 20 minutes before the peloton began its pursuit, but they were unsuccessful on several attempts. The break was reduced to five riders – Aular, Nicholas Dlamini, Polychronis Tzortzakis, Michael Kukrle, and Juraj Sagan – after the first climb, ahead of the peloton by around 16 minutes. The break's lead gradually decreased as the climb went on, reaching the top of Fuji Sanroku with a lead of almost six minutes. This had dwindled to around four minutes as the leading group reached Fuji Speedway. During the speedway run, the peloton launched more chases of the lead group, which began to splinter as Sagan and Dlamini couldn't continue with the quick pace. The rest of the lead group was slowly consumed back into a much-decreased peloton during the second speedway pass, with Aular and Kukrle the last to be caught just as the group headed to Mikuni Pass.

Aular was one of 41 cyclists who did not finish the course; he had headed the race in the leading group from the start for around 180 kilometres (110 mi), but had to withdraw due to exhaustion at 191 kilometres (119 mi). He returned to Europe after the race to compete in the Volta a Portugal beginning 4 August.

=== BMX ===
Athlete	Event	Seeding		Final	
Athlete	Event	Score	Rank	Score	Rank
Daniel Dhers	Men's freestyle	85.10	3	92.05	2nd place, silver medalist(s)

==== Men's freestyle ====
Venezuela automatically qualified for the men's BMX freestyle as one of the highest ranked at 2019 UCI Urban Cycling World Championships.

The BMX freestyle competition is a two-round tournament, with a seeding round and a final. Each round has the cyclists perform two runs, which are 60 seconds long. Five judges give scores between 0.00 and 99.99 based on the difficulty and execution of the rider's run; the scores are averaged for a total run score. The scores in the seeding round are used to determine the start order of the cyclists in the final, with the top-seeding cyclists going last and the rest preceding in reverse order. In the final, only the best of the rider's two runs counts. The events took place at the Ariake Urban Sports Park.

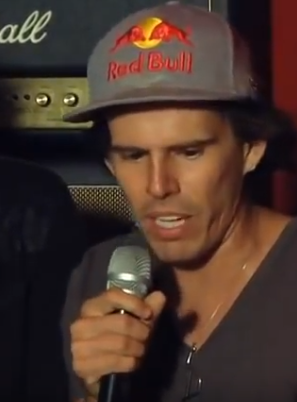
Daniel Dhers in 2012

Venezuelan cyclist Daniel Dhers, who has had the longest career in the sport and runs the North Carolina bike park where many Olympic BMX riders train, had helped BMX events become competitive in the late 1990s and, in the 21st century, advocated for it to be added to the Olympics, acting as the "de facto spokesperson" for BMX riders negotiating how the sport would transition. He said that having BMX in a competitive format on an international platform would encourage people to take up the sport as they watch the athletes have fun, as well as legitimize the sport to parents who can see a structured format and rules. He also said that the inclusion of BMX would be mutually beneficial, bringing a "fresh look" to the Olympics.

When BMX freestyle was added to the Olympic program in 2017, Dhers expected it to not appear until the next Olympiad and debut at Paris 2024, by which time he had planned to retire. Being told that the event would appear at Japan 2020, he decided to stay in competition and try to qualify. During the Games he told CNN that he hopes to also compete at Paris.

Dhers was the oldest competitor in the event, but was optimistic about his chances, saying: "If I end up winning the Olympic gold, it would be for one of the smallest countries in one of the smallest sports just introduced into the Olympics - that would be insane." Despite his age, a sport preview by Olympics.com noted him as one of the favorites along with Brandon Loupos of Australia and Rim Nakamura of Japan.

Seeding
Rank	Run 1	Run 2	Average
3	84.20	86.00	85.10

In seeding on 31 July, Dhers went fourth and placed third with an average 85.10 run, meaning he would perform third-last in the final. Dhers scored in the mid-80s in the seeding, having a first run of 84.20 and second of 86.00, slightly below second-placed Nakamura, while Australian Logan Martin achieved two runs scoring above 90.

Final
Rank	Run 1	Run 2	Best
2nd place, silver medalist(s)	90.10	92.05	92.05

Dhers improved on his seeding scores with two runs scoring above 90 in the final on 1 August; he started his first final run with a triple tailwhip and gap transfer, scoring 90.10 to sit in first on the leaderboard before Martin went out for his first run. Martin also improved on his seeding score, leading the event with 93.30. In the second run Declan Brooks and Kenneth Tencio beat Dhers's first run score; having to improve to get a medal, Dhers used more combination moves in his second run, packing his run full with flares and one-handed tricks. He achieved a 92.05 for this run, giving him the silver medal behind Martin, who crashed in his second run.

At the Olympics, Dhers said:

I think it's been super important to be able to showcase freestyle BMX on the biggest stage in the world. BMX Freestyle has come a long way, we used to go out in the streets, kind of create havoc. Now, we are real athletes. The Olympics solidified that position for us. We take care of our body, we take care of our minds and we just love to do crazy tricks. I'm glad, I'm so psyched that people back at home are watching it, enjoying it because it's a beautiful sport. To me, it means the world that we finally made it to the big event.

— Daniel Dhers

== Diving ==
Venezuela qualified one diver.

Athlete	Event	Preliminaries		Semifinals		Final	
Athlete	Event	Points	Rank	Points	Rank	Points	Rank
Óscar Ariza	10 m platform	327.05	22	Did not advance			

=== Men's 10 m platform ===
Óscar Ariza competed for Venezuela in the men's 10 m platform after qualifying at the 2021 FINA Diving World Cup. The preliminary round was held on 6 August at the Tokyo Aquatics Centre.

There are three rounds to the platform diving: preliminaries, semi-final, and final. In each round, divers perform six dives, one from each of the six groups (forward, back, reverse, inward, twisting, and armstand). The top 18 in the preliminaries move on to the semi-final, and the top 12 of the semi-final progress to the final. Each dive is given a difficulty rating, and seven judges rank the execution of the dive out of 10 (in increments of 0.5); the three median execution scores are added together and multiplied by the difficulty to give the points for each dive.

Rank	Preliminary						
Rank	Dive 1	Dive 2	Dive 3	Dive 4	Dive 5	Dive 6	Points
22	52.50	70.95	28.80	57.80	59.40	57.60	327.05

Points breakdown
Dive			DD	Execution							Points	Rank
Dive			DD	J1	J2	J3	J4	J5	J6	J7	Points	Rank
1	Forward 3½ Somersaults	Pike	3.0	~~6.5~~	~~5.5~~	~~5.5~~	~~6.0~~	5.5	6.0	6.0	52.50	24
2	Back 3½ Somersaults	Tuck	3.3	~~7.5~~	~~7.5~~	~~7.0~~	7.0	7.0	~~6.5~~	7.5	70.95	19
3	Inward 3½ Somersaults	Tuck	3.2	~~3.0~~	~~2.5~~	~~3.0~~	3.0	3.0	3.0	~~2.5~~	28.80	27
4	Reverse 3½ Somersaults	Tuck	3.4	~~6.0~~	~~6.0~~	~~5.5~~	6.0	~~5.5~~	5.5	5.5	57.80	24
5	Armstand Back Double Somersault 2½ Twists	Free	3.6	~~5.0~~	~~5.5~~	5.5	5.5	~~6.0~~	5.5	~~5.0~~	59.40	24
6	Back 2½ Somersaults 1½ Twists	Pike	3.2	6.0	~~6.5~~	6.0	~~5.5~~	~~5.5~~	6.0	~~6.5~~	57.60	22

Ariza went out in the preliminary round, placing 22nd with a total of 327.05, 219.85 points behind first-placed qualifier Yang Jian and 12.25 points behind the lowest reserve place scorer Isaac Souza.

== Fencing ==
The fencing events took place at Makuhari Messe; the competition is run in an elimination format, with the first fencer to achieve 15 touches on their opponent winning.

Athlete	Event	Round of 64	Round of 32	Round of 16	Quarterfinal	Semifinal	Final / BM	
Athlete	Event	Opposition Score	Opposition Score	Opposition Score	Opposition Score	Opposition Score	Opposition Score	Rank
Rubén Limardo	Men's épée	Bye	Cannone (FRA); L 12–15	did not advance				18
José Quintero	Men's sabre	Yoshida (JPN); W 15–13	Szilágyi (HUN); L 7–15	did not advance				32

=== Men's épée ===
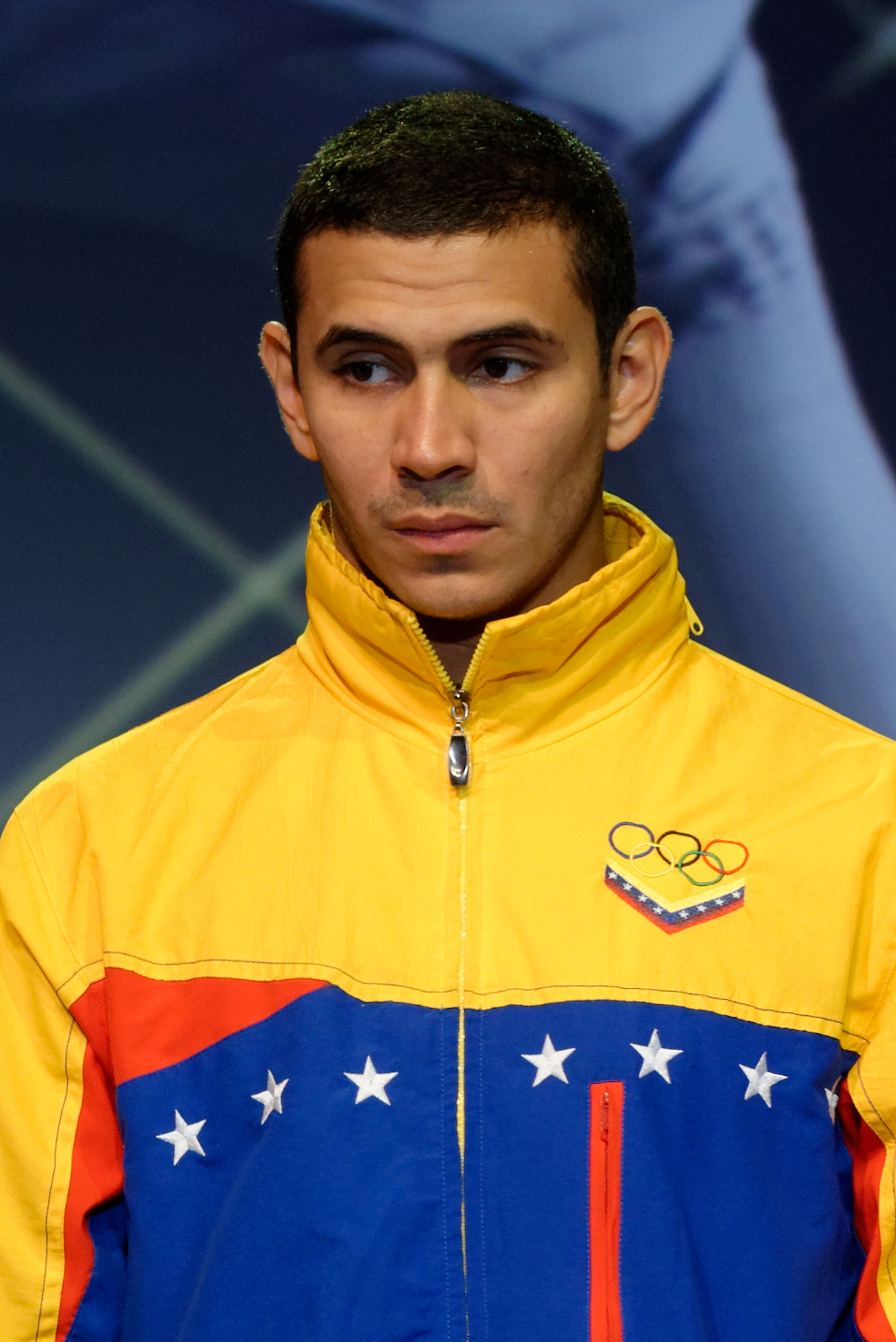
Rubén Limardo in 2013

At the 2012 Olympics, Rubén Limardo won the gold medal in men's épée, becoming Venezuela's second Olympic gold medalist overall. He hoped to win again in Tokyo and become the first Venezuelan to win at two Olympic Games, as well as aspiring to win an Olympic medal in the team event with his two brothers, Jesús and Francisco. Rubén and Francisco had previously competed in the team event at Beijing 2008, placing 6th. After his 2012 gold, Limardo was the flagbearer for Venezuela at Rio 2016.

The brothers primarily live and train in Poland; to afford to bring his wife and family to Europe and support them during the COVID-19 pandemic, Limardo took a job as a food delivery rider. In December 2020 he said he was still training for Tokyo despite needing to work, complaining on social media that even though he won a gold medal and was an elected senator for the ruling party in Venezuela, he gets no funding to support his training; he had similarly criticized Maduro in 2019, when Limardo explained that he only attempted to get into politics to help fund sports in his impoverished home state of Bolívar.

Limardo qualified in the men's épée as the top-ranked fencer from the Americas in the FIE Adjusted Official Rankings.

The men's épée event at Tokyo 2020 took place on 25 July 2021. Limardo was seeded 10th. He passed the round of 64 in a bye based on seeding, then lost to eventual gold medal winner Romain Cannone in bout 46 in the round of 32. He took the first touch, and then managed two joint touches while Cannone dominated the first period, ending 3–8; again taking the first touch in the second period, Limardo was more dominant, taking it to 11–14 before a joint touch gave Cannone the win 12–15.

=== Men's sabre ===
José Quintero qualified for the Olympics by winning the final match of the men's sabre at the Pan American Zonal Qualifier in San José, Costa Rica. He contested the men's sabre, which took place on 24 July 2021; he was seeded last. In the round of 64 he fought in bout 15, defeating Japan's Kento Yoshida 15–13. Quintero led 8–6 after the first period, putting in a similar performance in the second period to win. He went out in the round of 32 after losing in bout 40 to two-time champion and eventual gold medalist Áron Szilágyi 7–15. In the first period, Quintero took the first touch and made it to 3–2 before a barrage from Szilágyi closed the period 3–8; Szilágyi continued to dominate at the start of the second period, taking it to 3–13, at which point Quintero managed a barrage of his own, reaching 7–13 before Szilágyi took the last two touches to win.

== Golf ==
Venezuela entered one male golfer into the Olympic tournament. Jhonattan Vegas qualified directly among the top 60 eligible players for the men's event. Venezuela's most successful golfer, he previously represented the country at the 2016 Olympics. The golf was played on the east course at Kasumigaseki Country Club from 29 July to 1 August.

Athlete	Event	Round 1	Round 2	Round 3	Round 4	Total		
Athlete	Event	Score	Score	Score	Score	Score	Par	Rank
Jhonattan Vegas	Men's	66	70	70	67	273	−11	T16

Scorecard
Hole	1	2	3	4	5	6	7	8	9	10	11	12	13	14	15	16	17	18	Total
Par	4	4	4	3	5	4	3	5	4	3	4	4	4	5	4	3	4	4	71
Round 1	5	4	3	3	5	3	3	4	4	3	4	4	4	5	4	2	3	3	66
Round 2	4	4	4	3	5	4	3	5	4	3	5	4	4	4	4	3	4	3	70
Round 3	4	4	3	4	5	3	5	4	4	3	4	4	4	5	3	3	4	4	70
Round 4	3	4	4	4	5	3	3	5	4	2	4	3	4	5	4	3	3	4	67

Key

Birdies
Par
Bogeys
Double-bogeys

In the first round, Vegas teed off twelfth, starting at the first hole, with Thomas Detry and Kalle Samooja. At the end of the round he was tied fifth on five under par. The same trio teed off second in round 2, also from the first hole; they finished the round on the third day due to inclement weather, and Vegas ended it tied eleventh on six under par. In the third round, Vegas teed off thirteenth with Paul Casey and Rory Sabbatini, again from the first hole. He ended the round joint seventeenth, at seven under par. In the final round, he teed off twelfth and from hole one again, with Sungjae Im and Alex Norén. He finished joint sixteenth at eleven under par.

During the tournament, Vegas ranked first for driving distance, averaging 304 metres (333 yards); he was tied seventh on driving accuracy, with 62.50% rate; he was tied ninth on hitting the green in regulation, with 76.39%; in scrambling, a measure of putting ability, Vegas managed 76.47% to tie on eighth. He tied on forty-four for sand saves, making one out of three, and was twenty-fourth in gaining strokes around the green, with 0.764; thirty-sixth for strokes gained approaching the green, with -0.784; and fortieth for strokes gained putting, with -0.992. However, he came first for strokes gained off the tee, with 4.260, making him eighteenth for total strokes gained on 3.248. He ranked twenty-fifth for his proximity to the hole distance putting, averaging 12 metres (37' 9"). He was tied twenty-eighth for total birdies, and tied first for total bogeys.

== Judo ==
Venezuela entered three female judoka into the Olympic tournament based on the International Judo Federation Olympics Individual Ranking.

Athlete	Event	Round of 32	Round of 16	Quarterfinals	Semifinals	Repechage	Final / BM	
Athlete	Event	Opposition Result	Opposition Result	Opposition Result	Opposition Result	Opposition Result	Opposition Result	Rank
Anriquelis Barrios	Women's –63 kg	Davydova (ROC); W 010–000	del Toro (CUB); W 010–000	Trstenjak (SLO); L 001–010	Did not advance	Ozdoba-Błach (POL); W 001–000	Beauchemin-Pinard (CAN); L 000–001	5
Elvismar Rodríguez	Women's –70 kg	Scoccimarro (GER); L 000–001	Did not advance					
Karen León	Women's –78 kg	Sampaio (POR); L 000–010	Did not advance					

=== Women's 63 kg ===
Anriquelis Barrios competed for Venezuela in the women's 63 kg category at the Budokan on 27 July. Barrios had lived and trained in Tokyo for three years prior to the Olympics.

Pool
Pool	Judoka	Elimination rounds						Quarter-final		
Pool	Judoka	Round of 32			Round of 16			Quarter-final		
Pool	Judoka	IPP	WAZ	Pen.	IPP	WAZ	Pen.	IPP	WAZ	Pen.
C	Barrios (VEN)	1	0	Yellow card	0	2	Yellow card	0	1	Yellow card
C	Opponent	0	0	–	0	0	–	0	2	–

Medal fights
Judoka	Repechage			Bronze medal bout		
Judoka	IPP	WAZ	Pen.	IPP	WAZ	Pen.
Barrios (VEN)	0	1	Yellow card	0	0	Yellow card
Opponent	0	0	–	0	1	–

Barrios was drawn in pool C, and first fought Daria Davydova in contest 11 in the round of 32. After receiving a yellow card at 47 seconds, Barrios went on to win by direct ippon (full point) in 2 minutes 52 seconds. She repeated the feat in contest 21 in the round of 16, defeating Maylín del Toro Carvajal. Barrios scored a waza-ari (half point) at 2 minutes 20 seconds, took on a yellow card at 3 minutes 7 seconds, before scoring another waza-ari to make a full ippon at 3 minutes 22 seconds. In contest 26, the quarterfinal, Barrios took the first waza-ari at 10 seconds, with her opponent Tina Trstenjak scoring a waza-ari at 1 minute 43 seconds. Barrios picked up a yellow card at 3 minutes 10 seconds. The round ended tied, and went to a golden score fight; Barrios got another yellow card at 6 minutes 22 seconds, before Trstenjak scored a waza-ari at 7 minutes 13 seconds, winning the fight, with Barrios going into the repechage to have a chance to contest the bronze medal. In her repechage, contest 33, against Agata Ozdoba-Błach, Barrios picked up a yellow card at 26 seconds but scored a waza-ari at 1 minute 3 seconds, going through to the bronze medal bout. In contest 41, the bout for bronze medal B, Barrios fought Catherine Beauchemin-Pinard, picking up a yellow card at 1 minute 45 seconds. With no points in normal time, the fight went to golden score; Beauchemin-Pinard scored a waza-ari at 7 minutes 3 seconds, winning.

=== Women's 70 kg ===
Pool
Pool	Judoka	Elimination rounds					
Pool	Judoka	Round of 32			Round of 16		
Pool	Judoka	IPP	WAZ	Pen.	IPP	WAZ	Pen.
D	Rodríguez (VEN)	0	0	–	did not advance		
D	Scoccimarro (GER)	0	1	Yellow card	did not advance		

Elvismar Rodríguez contested the women's 70 kg category on 28 July. She was drawn in pool D and went out in contest 11 in the round of 32 in her fight against Giovanna Scoccimarro, who scored a waza-ari at 1 minute 13 seconds; though Scoccimarro picked up a yellow card at 3 minutes 20 seconds, Rodríguez did not score and so did not proceed.

=== Women's 78 kg ===
Pool
Pool	Judoka	Elimination rounds					
Pool	Judoka	Round of 32			Round of 16		
Pool	Judoka	IPP	WAZ	Pen.	IPP	WAZ	Pen.
D	León (VEN)	0	0	–	did not advance		
D	Sampaio (POR)	1	0	–	did not advance		

Karen León contested the women's 78 kg category on 29 July. She was drawn in pool D and went out in contest 7 in the round of 32 in her fight against Patrícia Sampaio, who scored an ippon at 2 minutes 51 seconds.

== Karate ==
Venezuela entered three karateka into the inaugural Olympic tournament.

=== Kumite ===
The kumite competition begins with a round-robin stage to sort athletes into pools, followed by a single elimination stage. The top two athletes from each pool advances to the semifinals, with the athlete that finished first in pool A facing the athlete that finished second in pool B in the semifinals, and vice versa. There are no bronze medal matches in the kumite events, with losers of the semifinals each receiving a bronze medal.

Athlete	Event	Group stage					Semifinals	Final	
Athlete	Event	Opposition Result	Opposition Result	Opposition Result	Opposition Result	Rank	Opposition Result	Opposition Result	Rank
Andrés Madera	Men's –67 kg	Kalniņš (LAT); L 2–4	Derafshipour (EOR); L 3–9	Da Costa (FRA); L 0–2	Al-Masatfa (JOR); L 1–4	5	did not advance		
Claudymar Garcés	Women's –61 kg	Heurtault (FRA); W 8–0	Yin X-y (CHN); L 0–2	Çoban (TUR); L 2–6	Someya (JPN); W 8–5	=2	did not advance (Eliminated by head-to-head)		

==== Men's 67 kg ====
The men's 67 kg kumite event took place at the Nippon Budokan on 5 August. Andrés Madera contested the elimination round in pool B, which featured an extra athlete (total six) due to the addition of Refugee Olympic Team athlete Hamoon Derafshipour. In the third bout of the round, he fought Italian Angelo Crescenzo and won 5–0, however, Crescenzo was injured and withdrew from the competition, with the result of the bout cancelled and the points Madera won forfeited. Madera went on to lose the other four bouts, placing fifth in the pool and joint-ninth in the event: in bout eight he fought Kalvis Kalniņš of Latvia, losing 2–4; in bout twelve he fought Derafshipour, losing 3–9; in the sixteenth bout he fought Steven Da Costa of France, losing 0–2; and in the twenty-first bout he took on Jordan's Abdelrahman Al-Masatfa, losing 1–4.

==== Women's 61 kg ====
The women's 61 kg kumite event took place at the Nippon Budokan on 6 August. Claudymar Garcés contested the elimination round in pool A. In the first bout, she fought Leïla Heurtault of France and won 8–0; she next fought China's Yin Xiaoyan in the fifth bout, losing 0–2. Her third fight, the ninth bout against Merve Çoban of Turkey, was also a loss, 2–6, but she won again in her next fight, the seventeenth bout against Japan's Mayumi Someya, 8–5. At the end of the elimination round, she was tied second in pool A with Çoban; as the Turkish athlete had beat Garcés in their bout, she proceeded to the semifinal, and Garcés was ranked third in the pool and joint-fourth in the event.

=== Kata ===
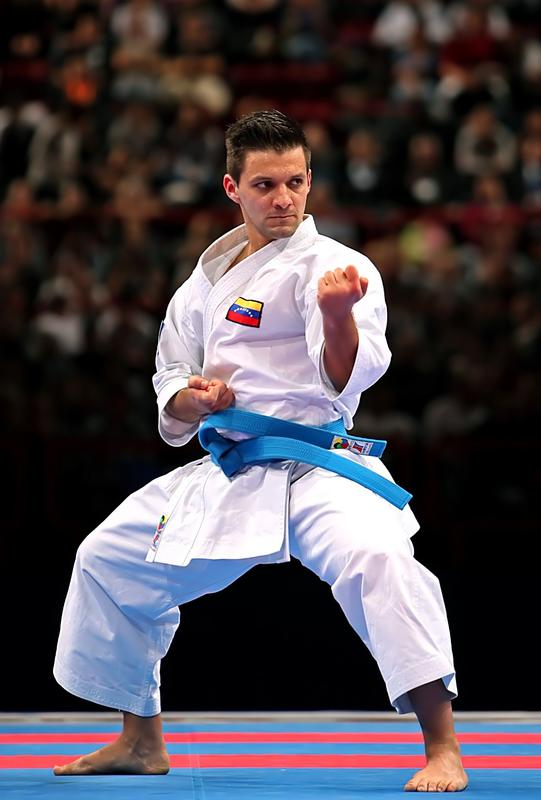
Antonio Díaz in 2012

The men's kata event took place at the Nippon Budokan on 6 August. In the kata event, athletes are divided at random into two pools. Each athlete performs two sets of kata in an elimination format, with the best three of each pool by average score then moving on to the ranking round and performing a third kata to determine whether they advance to the gold medal bout or one of two bronze medal bouts; the top athlete in each pool contests the gold medal, with the loser of this bout taking silver. The second-placed athlete in pool A will contest the third-placed athlete in pool B for one of two bronze medals, and vice versa with the remaining two athletes for the other bronze medal. The losers of these bouts are placed joint fourth.

Athlete	Event	Elimination round		Ranking round		Final / BM	
Athlete	Event	Score	Rank	Score	Rank	Opposition Result	Rank
Antonio Díaz	Men's kata	26.07	3 Q	26.28	3 Q	Bronze medal final Ariel Torres (USA); L 26.34–26.72	=4

2019 Pan American Games champion Antonio Díaz qualified directly for the men's kata category by finishing among the top four karateka at the end of the combined WKF Olympic Rankings. Díaz is the all-time world leader in kata wins. He planned to retire in 2020, following the Olympics, and postponed this for a year so that he could still make the Games. The 2020 Olympics was his last competition, and he told Inside the Games that he felt some regret at his swan song having no spectators, but that his wife had assured him there would be no bigger audience than people watching the Olympics from home around the world; he said that he wanted "to give [his] career a true Hollywood ending".

Pool
Pool	Elimination Round				Ranking Round		Qualification
Pool	1st kata	2nd kata	Avg.	Rank	3rd kata	Rank	Qualification
B	25.74	26.40	26.07	3 Q	26.28	3 q	Bronze medal bout

Bronze medal bout

6 August; 19:30	Ariel Torres (USA)	26.72–26.34	Antonio Díaz (VEN)

Antonio Díaz performing Anan in 2016

Points breakdown
Round	Kata	Technical Perf.	Athletics Perf.	Total	Rank after kata
Pool B Elimination	Nipaipo	18.06	7.68	25.74	3 (Pool B)
Pool B Elimination	Suparinpei	18.48	7.92	26.40	3 (Pool B)
Pool B Ranking	Anan	18.48	7.80	26.28	3 (Pool B)
Bronze medal bout	Chatanyara Kushanku	18.48	7.86	26.34	=4

In the elimination round, Díaz competed in pool B. His first kata was Nipaipo, for which he was scored 18.06 on technical performance and 7.68 on athletic performance, for a total of 25.74. His second kata was Suparinpei, for which he was scored 18.48 on technical and 7.92 on athletic, for a total of 26.40 and a two-kata average of 26.07. This placed him third in the pool and he continued to the ranking round. In this round, his kata was Anan, which he performed for an 18.48 technical score and 7.80 athletic score, giving a total of 26.28, leaving him in third to contest a bronze medal match. He came second in his bronze medal match for overall joint-fourth, performing the kata Chatanyara Kushanku with an 18.48 technical score and 7.86 athletic score, totalling 26.34 against American Ariel Torres' 26.72.

== Rowing ==
Venezuela qualified one boat in the men's lightweight double sculls for the Games by finishing last in the A-final and securing the second of three berths available at the 2021 FISA Americas Olympic Qualification Regatta in Rio de Janeiro, Brazil.

Athlete	Event	Heats		Repechage		Semifinals		Final	
Athlete	Event	Time	Rank	Time	Rank	Time	Rank	Time	Rank
César Amaris; José Güipe	Men's lightweight double sculls	6:46.11	5 R	7:01.46	5 FC	Bye		6:36.37	15

Qualification Legend: FA=Final A (medal); FB=Final B (non-medal); FC=Final C (non-medal); FD=Final D (non-medal); FE=Final E (non-medal); FF=Final F (non-medal); SA/B=Semifinals A/B; SC/D=Semifinals C/D; SE/F=Semifinals E/F; QF=Quarterfinals; R=Repechage

=== Men's lightweight double sculls ===
Heats
Heat	Rank	Lane	Rower	Time	Notes
1	5	6	Amaris; Güipe	6:46.11	R

Repechage
Heat	Rank	Lane	Rower	Time	Notes
2	5	1	Amaris; Güipe	7:01.46	FC

Finals
Final	Rank	Lane	Rower	Time	Notes
C	15	2	Amaris; Güipe	6:36.37	

== Sailing ==
Venezuelan sailors qualified one boat in each of the following classes through the class-associated World Championships, and the continental regattas.

Athlete	Event	Race											Net points	Final rank
Athlete	Event	1	2	3	4	5	6	7	8	9	10	M*	Net points	Final rank
Andrés Lage	Men's finn	15	18	18	18	~~19~~	18	18	17	19	13	EL	154	18

M = Medal race; EL = Eliminated – did not advance into the medal race

== Shooting ==
Venezuela entered one shooter at the games, after getting the allocation quotas.

Athlete	Event	Qualification		Final	
Athlete	Event	Points	Rank	Points	Rank
Julio Iemma	Men's 10 m air rifle	618.3	43	Did not advance	
Julio Iemma	Men's 50 m rifle 3 positions	1132	39	did not advance	

=== Men's 10 m air rifle ===
Qualification round
Rank	1	2	3	4	5	6	Total
43	103.1	104.3	101.3	103.8	103.8	102.0	618.3

=== Men's 50 m rifle 3 positions ===
Qualification round
Rank	Kneeling	Prone	Standing	Total
39	376	388	368	1132-41x

== Swimming ==
Athlete	Event	Heat		Semifinal		Final	
Athlete	Event	Time	Rank	Time	Rank	Time	Rank
Alberto Mestre	Men's 50 m freestyle	21.96	14 Q	22.22	15	did not advance	
Alberto Mestre	Men's 100 m freestyle	49.44	33	did not advance			
Alfonso Mestre	Men's 400 m freestyle	3:47.14	16	—N/a		did not advance	
Alfonso Mestre	Men's 800 m freestyle	7:52.07	15	—N/a		did not advance	
Paola Pérez	Women's 10 km open water	—N/a				2:05:45.0	20
Jeserik Pinto	Women's 50 m freestyle	25.65	32	—N/a		did not advance	
Jeserik Pinto	Women's 100 m butterfly	1:00.60	29	did not advance			

=== Men's 50 m freestyle ===
In the heats, the swimmers with the top 16 times, regardless of heat, advanced to the semifinals. In the semifinals, the swimmers with the best 8 times, regardless of heat, advanced to the final.

Heats
Rank	Heat	Lane	Time	Notes
14	9	8	21.96	Q

Semifinals
Rank	Heat	Lane	Time
15	1	1	22.22

=== Men's 100 m freestyle ===
The swimmers with the top 16 times, regardless of heat, advance to the semifinals.

Heats
Rank	Heat	Lane	Time
33	5	6	49.44

=== Men's 400 m freestyle ===
The swimmers with the top 8 times, regardless of heat, advance to the final.

Heats
Rank	Heat	Lane	Time	Notes
16	2	4	3:47.14	NR

=== Men's 800 m freestyle ===
The swimmers with the top 8 times, regardless of heat, advanced to the final.

Heats
Rank	Heat	Lane	Time
15	3	5	7:52.07

=== Women's 50 m freestyle ===
The swimmers with the top 16 times, regardless of heat, advanced to the semifinals.

Heats
Rank	Heat	Lane	Time
32	7	2	25.65

=== Women's 100 m butterfly ===
The swimmers with the top 16 times, regardless of heat, advanced to the semifinals.

Heats
Rank	Heat	Lane	Time
29	2	2	1:00.60

=== Women's 10 km open water ===
The marathon 10 kilometre races are held in open water. No preliminary heats are held, with only the single mass-start race being contested. The race is held using freestyle swimming, with a lack of stroke regulations.

Rank	Time	Time behind
20	2:05:45.0	+6:14.2

== Volleyball ==
=== Indoor ===
Team	Event	Group stage						Quarterfinal	Semifinal	Final / BM	
Team	Event	Opposition Score	Opposition Score	Opposition Score	Opposition Score	Opposition Score	Rank	Opposition Score	Opposition Score	Opposition Score	Rank
Venezuela men's	Men's tournament	Japan; L 0–3	Iran; L 0–3	Poland; L 1–3	Canada; L 0–3	Italy; L 0–3	6	did not advance			

==== Men's tournament ====
Venezuela men's volleyball team qualified for the Olympics by winning the pool round and securing an outright berth at the South American Olympic Qualification Tournament in Mostazal, Chile, marking the country's reappearance in the sport for the first time since Beijing 2008.

The Venezuelan team was seeded 36th following the serpentine system according to the FIVB World Ranking as of 15 October 2019. They were seeded bottom of pool A in the preliminary rounds, and were the lowest-ranked team in the competition.

Team roster

The Venezuela roster was announced on 2 July 2021.

Head coach: (Venezuela) Ronald Sarti

- 1 Armando Velásquez S
- 3 Fernando González OH
- 4 Héctor Mata L
- 5 Emerson Rodríguez OP
- 6 Robert Oramas MB
- 7 Edson Valencia MB
- 9 José Carrasco (c) S
- 11 José Verdi MB
- 14 Eliécer Canelo OH
- 15 Luis Arias OP
- 17 Ronald Fayola OH
- 19 Willner Rivas OH

The captain of the Venezuelan team was number 9, José Carrasco, and the assistant coach was Humberto Montes de Oca.

Group play

Pos	Team	Pld	W	L	Pts	SW	SL	SR	SPW	SPL	SPR	Qualification
1	Poland	5	4	1	13	14	4	3.500	435	365	1.192	Quarterfinals
2	Italy	5	4	1	11	12	7	1.714	447	411	1.088	Quarterfinals
3	Japan (H)	5	3	2	8	10	9	1.111	437	433	1.009	Quarterfinals
4	Canada	5	2	3	7	9	9	1.000	396	387	1.023	Quarterfinals
5	Iran	5	2	3	6	9	11	0.818	453	460	0.985	
6	Venezuela	5	0	5	0	1	15	0.067	281	393	0.715	

Source: Tokyo 2020 and FIVB
Rules for classification: Tiebreakers
(H) Host

24 July 2021; 17:05 v	Japan	3–0	Venezuela	Ariake Arena, Tokyo; Referees: Luis Macias (MEX), Vladimir Simonovic (SRB)
24 July 2021; 17:05 v	(25–21, 25–20, 25–15); Results Statistics			Ariake Arena, Tokyo; Referees: Luis Macias (MEX), Vladimir Simonovic (SRB)

Venezuela faced Japan in match 2 of pool A. Japan won in straight sets. Japan made the first serve of the first set, serving out and giving Venezuela a point. Venezuela then served, the ball was returned, and it was sent out to give Japan a point. The short volleys and missed serves continued until the end of the set, with no volley having more than three touches, including serves. Japan edged the set to defeat Venezuela 25–21. Japan again served first in the second set, taking three points from Venezuela fouls before Venezuela scored. The fifth point of the second set, taking Venezuela to 3–2, was the first and only of the match to go over three touches, with the teams then returning to short volleys, missed serves, and fouls, to finish out the set 25–20 to Japan. The third set went much the same, the teams matching each other for eight points before Japan began taking multiple points in succession; though Venezuela pulled some back, Japan had a cleaner lead and won the set 25–15.

26 July 2021; 09:00 v	Iran	3–0	Venezuela	Ariake Arena, Tokyo; Referees: Hernán Casamiquela (ARG), Susana Rodríguez (ESP)
26 July 2021; 09:00 v	(25–17, 25–20, 25–18); Results Statistics			Ariake Arena, Tokyo; Referees: Hernán Casamiquela (ARG), Susana Rodríguez (ESP)

In match 4, Venezuela faced Iran, who also won in straight sets. Venezuela served first in the first set, missing the return to give Iran the point. The teams then matched each other in missed serves and short volleys until it was 10–10, when Iran began to dominate: Venezuela picked up some points from Iranian fouls but the set finished out 25–17. Iran served first in the second set, but the first point went to Venezuela. They stayed ahead as Iran matched them on the back foot for a few more points until Iran took the seventh and eighth points in succession, establishing a marginal lead at 5–3. The gap would remain as the teams continued to match each other in short volleys; when Iran was ahead on 10–8 they began taking two points for each Venezuela won, but when it reached 19–15, Venezuela mounted a comeback, taking three points in succession and countering each point Iran took after that. It proved too late, however, as Iran won the set 25–20. Venezuela then had the first serve of the third set, which they missed. Starting the set 2–0 down, Venezuela pulled back some quick points to take it to 3–4, staying just ahead as the teams matched each other to reach 8–9; Venezuela then took it to 8–11 before Iran responded in kind, leveling the scores. This repeated for the next nine points, with Venezuela moving a few points ahead before Iran pulled it back level; after the scores were 14–14, Iran moved ahead, taking the next five points to reach 19–14. Though Venezuela responded as the set closed out, the lead was again insurmountable, Iran taking the third set 25–18.

28 July 2021; 17:15 v	Poland	3–1	Venezuela	Ariake Arena, Tokyo; Referees: Hamid Al-Rousi (UAE), Shin Muranaka (JPN)
28 July 2021; 17:15 v	(25–16, 25–13, 18–25, 25–15); Results Statistics			Ariake Arena, Tokyo; Referees: Hamid Al-Rousi (UAE), Shin Muranaka (JPN)

Venezuela played Poland in match 8, winning the third set to lose three sets to one. Poland served first in the first set, winning the point but conceding the next. In the next few points they edged ahead of Venezuela, something repeated until they reached 13–10 in Poland's favor, when they won three points in a row; though Venezuela took points to bring it to 16–11 and then 17–12, Poland continued to win multiple points in succession as Venezuela tried to catch up, winning 25–16. In the second set, Venezuela served first and dropped the point, as they did with the next two. They then took a point to bring it to 3–1, but Poland again took a sequence of points. With two points for each of Venezuela's, Poland continued to dominate in this way for the rest of the second set, including an unbroken six-point win streak from 13–9 to 19–9; they took the set 25–13. Venezuela performed better in the third set, starting well after Poland served but lost the point, with Venezuela also taking the second point. Trading points through the set, Venezuela maintained their small lead before adding to it with a run of points from 9–10 to 11–17. Though Poland began to take points to match Venezuela, the margin led Venezuela to an 18–25 win. The match then went to a fourth set, with Venezuela serving first but losing the point to start on the back foot. Poland re-asserted their dominance with a run of points from 3–2 to 8–4; continuing to trade points again, Poland had a last run from 22–15 to 25–15, winning.

30 July 2021; 09:00 v	Canada	3–0	Venezuela	Ariake Arena, Tokyo; Referees: Patricia Rolf (USA), Susana Rodríguez (ESP)
30 July 2021; 09:00 v	(25–13, 25–22, 25–12); Results Statistics			Ariake Arena, Tokyo; Referees: Patricia Rolf (USA), Susana Rodríguez (ESP)

In match 10, Venezuela faced Canada, losing in straight sets. They served first in the first set, winning the point before Canada took the next two points; though Venezuela equalized, a run took Canada to 5–2 and they began trading points to reach 10–8. Canada then only dropped two points while taking it to 19–10. A dominant end to the set gave Canada the win 25–13. Canada served first in the second set, taking three points before Venezuela scored. Venezuela closed the margin at 6–6, and the two teams stayed close throughout the set, reaching 21–21 before diverging when Canada took a run of points to lead 24–21. Each took one more point for Canada to win 25–22. In the third set, Venezuela served first but Canada won the point; though Venezuela won the second point, Canada had a run to reach 5–1. Four points later they repeated the feat, leading a run to 9–4. Canada continued to show dominance, taking several more runs of points, winning 25–12.

1 August 2021; 16:25 v	Italy	3–0	Venezuela	Ariake Arena, Tokyo; Referees: Hernán Casamiquela (ARG), Sumie Myoi (JPN)
1 August 2021; 16:25 v	(25–22, 25–15, 25–17); Results Statistics			Ariake Arena, Tokyo; Referees: Hernán Casamiquela (ARG), Sumie Myoi (JPN)

Venezuela played Italy in match 14, losing in straight sets. In the first set, Venezuela served first and dropped the point, but fairly matched Italy throughout the set all the way to 22–22; Italy then had a run of points to win 25–22. In the second set, Italy served first and won the point, taking it to 5–1 before Venezuela started matching them. A run for Italy from 9–6 to 17–7 set them apart further; while Venezuela countered to match point-for-point in the remainder, the margin saw Italy win the set 25–15. The third set began with the teams matching each other again, reaching 11–11 before Italy moved a few points ahead, holding that margin to 17–14 before increasing it to 19–14 and finishing out the set and match 25–17.

== Weightlifting ==
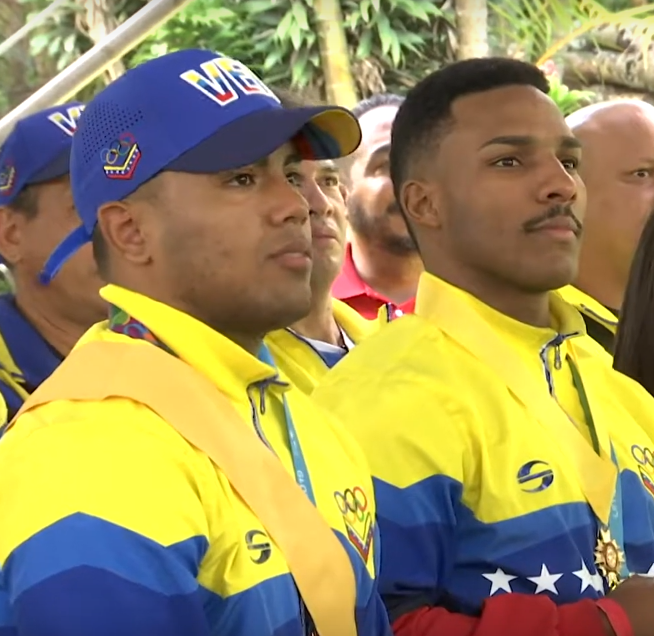
Keydomar Vallenilla (left) and Julio Mayora in 2019

Venezuelan weightlifters qualified for four quota places at the games, based on the Tokyo 2020 Rankings Qualification List of 11 June 2021.

After new weight classes were introduced in 2018, the previous records were retired and replaced with Olympic and World (Olympic format) Standards to be met. The Olympic weightlifting event comprises two parts: a snatch lift, where the bar is raised in one movement, and a clean and jerk lift, where it is raised to the chest and then above the head.

Athlete	Event	Snatch		Clean & Jerk		Total	Rank
Athlete	Event	Result	Rank	Result	Rank	Total	Rank
Julio Mayora	Men's −73 kg	156	2	190	3	346	2nd place, silver medalist(s)
Keydomar Vallenilla	Men's −96 kg	177	2	210	2	387	2nd place, silver medalist(s)
Yusleidy Figueroa	Women's –59 kg	91	8	115	5	206	6
Naryury Pérez	Women's –87 kg	112	4	130	8	242	7

=== Men's 73 kg ===
The men's 73 kg weightlifting competitions took place on 28 July at the Tokyo International Forum.

Snatch (kg)				Clean & Jerk (kg)				Total	Rank
1	2	3	Rank	1	2	3	Rank	Total	Rank
150	154	156	2	186	190	~~198~~	2	346	2nd place, silver medalist(s)

Julio Mayora represented Venezuela in the men's 73 kg category. In Mayora's second lift of the clean and jerk, he matched the Olympic Standard of 190 kg. Added to his snatch lift, his total weight lifted, 346 kg, was 1 kg greater than the Olympic Standard. He came second to Shi Zhiyong, who set the new Olympic and World records. Mayora and Shi lifted in Group A, and Mayora celebrated his win with a back flip.

=== Men's 96 kg ===
The men's 96 kg weightlifting competitions took place on 31 July at the Tokyo International Forum.

Snatch (kg)				Clean & Jerk (kg)				Total	Rank
1	2	3	Rank	1	2	3	Rank	Total	Rank
172	175	177	2	210	~~215~~	~~216~~	2	387	2nd place, silver medalist(s)

Keydomar Vallenilla represented Venezuela in the men's 96 kg category. Meso Hassona won Qatar's first gold medal, with Vallenilla 15 kg behind in second, taking the silver. After missing his second clean and jerk lift at 215 kg, Vallenilla raised the bar to 216 kg; after the lift, he and his team celebrated wildly on the mat before noticing that he was given two red lights, showing that two of the three judges felt the lift was not clean. The Venezuelan team sent it to a jury review, which stuck with the failed lift. Making the lift would not have changed the results.

=== Women's 59 kg ===
The women's 59 kg weightlifting competitions took place on 27 July at the Tokyo International Forum.

Snatch (kg)				Clean & Jerk (kg)				Total	Rank
1	2	3	Rank	1	2	3	Rank	Total	Rank
~~88~~	88	91	8	115	~~120~~	~~125~~	5	206	6

=== Women's 87 kg ===
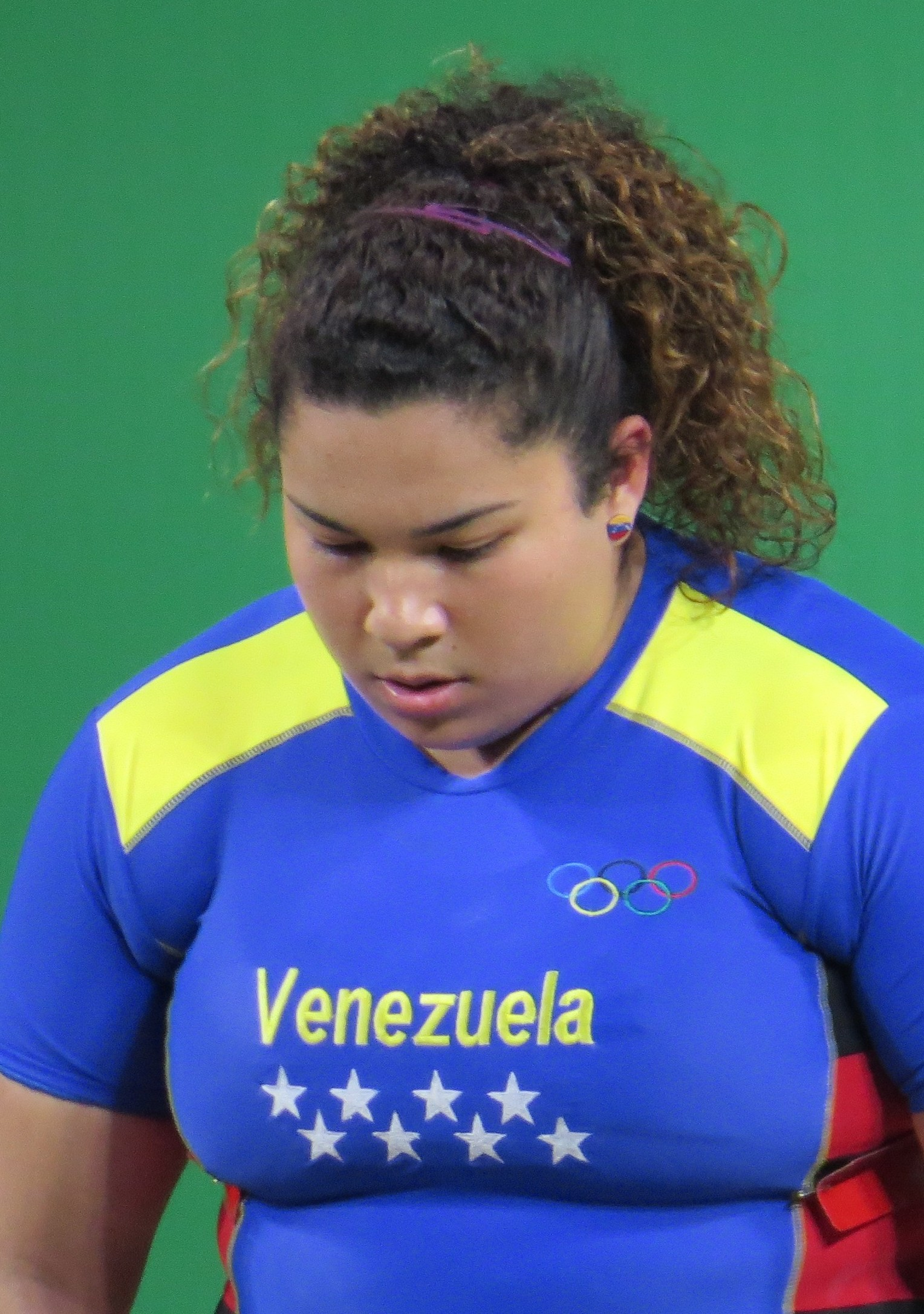
Perez in 2016

The women's 87 kg weightlifting competitions took place on 2 August at the Tokyo International Forum.

Snatch (kg)				Clean & Jerk (kg)				Total	Rank
1	2	3	Rank	1	2	3	Rank	Total	Rank
105	109	112	4	130	~~137~~	~~138~~	8	246	7
