= 2017 Men's Pan-American Volleyball Cup =

Tournament details
- Host country: Canada
- Dates: July 25–30, 2017
- Teams: 8
- Venue: 1 (in 1 host city)

Final positions
- Champions: Argentina (1st title)

Tournament awards
- MVP: (Argentina) Martín Ramos

The 2017 Men's Pan-American Volleyball Cup was the twelfth edition of the annual Men's Pan-American volleyball tournament. It was held in Gatineau, Quebec, Canada, from 25 July to 30 July. Eight teams competed in the tournament. Argentina won the tournament for the first time, Puerto Rico and Cuban won Silver and Bronze. Argentinian Martín Ramos was selected Most Valuable Player.

== Competing nations ==
Group A	Group B
Cuba; Dominican Republic; Mexico; United States	Argentina; Canada; Puerto Rico; Venezuela

== Competition format ==
The competition format for the 2017 Pan American Volleyball Cup divides the eight participating teams in 2 groups of 4 teams each.

The best team from Group A and Group B will advance to the semifinals, the second and third teams from Group B will play the quarterfinals against the second and third teams from Pool A.

=== Pool standing procedure ===
Match won 3–0: 5 points for the winner, 0 point for the loser
Match won 3–1: 4 points for the winner, 1 points for the loser
Match won 3–2: 3 points for the winner, 2 points for the loser
In case of tie, the teams were classified according to the following criteria:
points ratio and sets ratio

== Preliminary round ==
- All times are in Eastern Daylight Time (UTC−04:00)

=== Group A ===
Pos	Team	Pld	W	L	Pts	SPW	SPL	SPR	SW	SL	SR	Qualification
1	Cuba	3	3	0	12	279	238	1.172	9	3	3.000	Semifinals
2	Dominican Republic	3	2	1	10	253	224	1.129	7	4	1.750	Quarterfinals
3	United States	3	1	2	6	246	267	0.921	5	7	0.714	Quarterfinals
4	Mexico	3	0	3	2	215	264	0.814	2	9	0.222	

Date	Time		Score		Set 1	Set 2	Set 3	Set 4	Set 5	Total	Report
25 Jul	16:00	Cuba	3–1	Dominican Republic	25–17	25–22	21–25	25–22		96–86	P2 P3
25 Jul	18:00	United States	3–1	Mexico	25–18	25–23	22–25	25–18		97–84	P2 P3
26 Jul	14:00	Dominican Republic	3–0	United States	25–14	25–12	25–19			75–45	P2 P3
26 Jul	18:00	Cuba	3–0	Mexico	25–15	25–18	25–15			75–48	P2 P3
27 Jul	14:00	Mexico	1–3	Dominican Republic	23–25	25–17	17–25	18–25		83–92	P2 P3
27 Jul	18:00	United States	2–3	Cuba	26–24	21–25	21–25	25–19	11–15	104–108	P2 P3

=== Group B ===
Pos	Team	Pld	W	L	Pts	SPW	SPL	SPR	SW	SL	SR	Qualification
1	Argentina	3	3	0	15	230	171	1.345	9	0	MAX	Semifinals
2	Puerto Rico	3	2	1	8	234	236	0.992	6	5	1.200	Quarterfinals
3	Canada	3	1	2	4	218	233	0.936	3	7	0.429	Quarterfinals
4	Venezuela	3	0	3	3	244	286	0.853	3	9	0.333	

Date	Time		Score		Set 1	Set 2	Set 3	Set 4	Set 5	Total	Report
25 Jul	14:00	Argentina	3–0	Puerto Rico	25–20	25–14	25–17			75–51	P2 P3
25 Jul	20:00	Canada	3–1	Venezuela	25–17	25–27	25–15	25–22		100–81	P2 P3
26 Jul	16:00	Argentina	3–0	Venezuela	25–17	25–18	28–26			78–61	P2 P3
26 Jul	20:00	Canada	0–3	Puerto Rico	21–25	16–25	22–25			59–75	P2 P3
27 Jul	16:00	Puerto Rico	3–2	Venezuela	25–19	17–25	25–17	25–27	16–14	108–102	P2 P3
27 Jul	20:00	Canada	0–3	Argentina	25–27	23–25	11–25			59–77	P2 P3

== Final round ==
=== Championship bracket ===
Quarterfinals
B2	Puerto Rico	3
A3	United States	1
A2	Dominican Republic	1
B3	Canada	3

Semifinals
A1	Cuba	1
B2	Puerto Rico	3
B1	Argentina	3
B3	Canada	0

Final
B2	Puerto Rico	1
B1	Argentina	3
Third place
A1	Cuba	3
B3	Canada	1

=== Quarterfinals ===
Date	Time		Score		Set 1	Set 2	Set 3	Set 4	Set 5	Total	Report
28 Jul	17:00	Dominican Republic	1–3	Canada	20–25	25–16	21–25	23–25		89–91	P2 P3
28 Jul	19:00	Puerto Rico	3–1	United States	25–21	25–22	20–25	25–14		95–82	P2 P3

=== 5th–8th classification ===
Date	Time		Score		Set 1	Set 2	Set 3	Set 4	Set 5	Total	Report
29 Jul	14:00	Mexico	1–3	Dominican Republic	26–24	24–26	19–25	20–25		89–100	P2 P3
29 Jul	16:00	Venezuela	0–3	United States	23–25	14–25	20–25			57–75	P2 P3

=== Semifinals ===
Date	Time		Score		Set 1	Set 2	Set 3	Set 4	Set 5	Total	Report
29 Jul	18:00	Argentina	3–0	Canada	25–23	25–15	25–10			75–48	P2 P3
29 Jul	20:00	Cuba	1–3	Puerto Rico	25–16	17–25	22–25	21–25		85–91	P2 P3

=== 7th place match ===
Date	Time		Score		Set 1	Set 2	Set 3	Set 4	Set 5	Total	Report
30 Jul	11:00	Mexico	2–3	Venezuela	25–22	16–25	25–23	17–25	13–15	96–110	P2 P3

=== 5th place match ===
Date	Time		Score		Set 1	Set 2	Set 3	Set 4	Set 5	Total	Report
30 Jul	13:00	Dominican Republic	2–3	United States	25–15	22–25	25–20	25–27	13–15	110–102	P2 P3

=== Bronze medal match ===
Date	Time		Score		Set 1	Set 2	Set 3	Set 4	Set 5	Total	Report
30 Jul	15:00	Canada	1–3	Cuba	18–25	21–25	25–22	23–25		87–97	P2 P3

=== Final ===
Date	Time		Score		Set 1	Set 2	Set 3	Set 4	Set 5	Total	Report
30 Jul	17:00	Argentina	3–1	Puerto Rico	25–23	25–18	23–25	25–20		98–86	P2 P3

== Final standing ==
Rank	Team
1st place, gold medalist(s)	Argentina
2nd place, silver medalist(s)	Puerto Rico
3rd place, bronze medalist(s)	Cuba
4	Canada
5	United States
6	Dominican Republic
7	Venezuela
8	Mexico

2017 Men's Pan-American Cup
champions

Argentina
First title

14–man roster
Toro, Flores, Cavanna, Fernández, Poglajen, Bruno, Solé,
Lima, Darraidou, Crer, De Cecco (c), González, Imhoff, Ramos
Head coach
Velasco

== Individual awards ==
- Most valuable player
  (Argentina) Martín Ramos
- Best setter
  (Puerto Rico) Edgardo Goás
- Best Outside Hitters
  (Cuba) Miguel Ángel López
  (Dominican Republic) Wilfrido Hernández
- Best Middle Blockers
  (United States) Mitchell Stahl
  (Argentina) Pablo Crer
- Best Opposite
  (Dominican Republic) José Miguel Cáceres
- Best scorer
  (Venezuela) Emerson Rodríguez
- Best server
  (Venezuela) Edson Valencia
- Best libero
  (Venezuela) Héctor Mata
- Best digger
  (Venezuela) Héctor Mata
- Best receiver
  (Venezuela) Héctor Mata
