= Emerson Rodríguez =

Emerson Rodríguez may refer to:

- Emerson Rodríguez (actor) (born 1983), Colombian actor
- Emerson Rodríguez (footballer) (born 2000), Colombian footballer
- Emerson Rodríguez (volleyball) (born 1993), Venezuelan volleyball player
