= Oramas =

Oramas is a surname of Spanish origin. Notable people with the surname include:

- Ana Oramas (born 1959), Spanish politician
- Faustino Oramas (1911 - 2007), Cuban singer
- Robert Oramas (born 1984), Venezuelan volleyball player
