= 2025 Men's Pan-American Volleyball Cup =

Volleyball tournament

Tournament details
- Host country: Mexico
- Dates: 26–31 August
- Teams: 12
- Venue: 1 (in 1 host city)

Final positions
- Champions: Venezuela (1st title)
- Runners-up: Mexico
- Third place: Canada
- Fourth place: Colombia

Tournament statistics
- Matches played: 34
- Attendance: 28,850 (849 per match)

The 2025 Men's Pan-American Volleyball Cup was the 18th edition of the annual men's volleyball tournament. It was held at the Domo de la Feria in León, Mexico from 26 to 31 August 2025.

The competition awards berths to the 2026 Men's Pan American Cup, the 2026 NORCECA Men's Championship, the 2026 Central American and Caribbean Games, and the 2027 Pan American Games.

Venezuela won their first title after defeating the hosts Mexico by 3–1 in the final. The two-time defending champion Canada defeated Colombia to claim the bronze medal. Willner Rivas of Venezuela was the most valuable player.

== Pool composition ==
Pool A	Pool B	Pool C
Antigua and Barbuda; Cuba; United States; Venezuela	Canada; Colombia; Guatemala; Puerto Rico	Chile; Dominican Republic; Mexico; Suriname

== Preliminary round ==
The two best group winners advanced directly to the semifinals while the third group winner advanced to the quarterfinals with the three second placed group teams.

=== Pool A ===
Pos	Team	Pld	W	L	Pts	SPW	SPL	SPR	SW	SL	SR	Qualification
1	Venezuela	3	3	0	15	234	176	1.330	9	0	MAX	Semifinals
2	United States	3	2	1	9	250	210	1.190	6	4	1.500	Quarterfinals
3	Cuba	3	1	2	6	222	220	1.009	4	6	0.667	Classification 7/10
4	Antigua and Barbuda	3	0	3	0	125	225	0.556	0	9	0.000	

Source: NORCECA

Date	Time		Score		Set 1	Set 2	Set 3	Set 4	Set 5	Total	Report
26 Aug	14:00	United States	0–3	Venezuela	21–25	26–28	29–31			76–84	P2 P3
26 Aug	18:00	Cuba	3–0	Antigua and Barbuda	25–19	25–10	25–17			75–46	P2 P3
27 Aug	10:00	United States	3–0	Antigua and Barbuda	25–12	25–11	25–17			75–40	P2 P3
27 Aug	16:00	Cuba	0–3	Venezuela	23–25	17–25	21–25			61–75	P2 P3
28 Aug	10:00	Venezuela	3–0	Antigua and Barbuda	25–15	25–16	25–8			75–39	P2 P3
28 Aug	18:00	United States	3–1	Cuba	25–20	23–25	26–24	25–17		99–86	P2 P3

=== Pool B ===
Pos	Team	Pld	W	L	Pts	SPW	SPL	SPR	SW	SL	SR	Qualification
1	Canada	3	3	0	13	277	246	1.126	9	2	4.500	Semifinals
2	Colombia	3	2	1	9	240	220	1.091	6	4	1.500	Quarterfinals
3	Puerto Rico	3	1	2	6	261	273	0.956	5	7	0.714	Classification 7/10
4	Guatemala	3	0	3	2	234	273	0.857	2	9	0.222	Classification 7/10

Source: NORCECA

Date	Time		Score		Set 1	Set 2	Set 3	Set 4	Set 5	Total	Report
26 Aug	10:00	Colombia	3–0	Guatemala	25–18	25–20	25–23			75–61	P2 P3
26 Aug	16:00	Canada	3–1	Puerto Rico	25–21	25–18	22–25	25–20		97–84	P2 P3
27 Aug	14:00	Canada	3–1	Guatemala	26–24	25–19	26–28	25–19		102–90	P2 P3
27 Aug	18:00	Colombia	3–1	Puerto Rico	18–25	25–18	25–18	25–20		93–81	P2 P3
28 Aug	14:00	Puerto Rico	3–1	Guatemala	25–21	21–25	25–20	25–17		96–83	P2 P3
28 Aug	16:00	Colombia	0–3	Canada	26–28	23–25	23–25			72–78	P2 P3

=== Pool C ===
Pos	Team	Pld	W	L	Pts	SPW	SPL	SPR	SW	SL	SR	Qualification
1	Chile	3	3	0	12	278	229	1.214	9	3	3.000	Quarterfinals
2	Mexico	3	2	1	12	253	212	1.193	8	3	2.667	Quarterfinals
3	Dominican Republic	3	1	2	6	217	223	0.973	4	6	0.667	Classification 7/10
4	Suriname	3	0	3	0	141	225	0.627	0	9	0.000	

Source: NORCECA

Date	Time		Score		Set 1	Set 2	Set 3	Set 4	Set 5	Total	Report
26 Aug	12:00	Chile	3–1	Dominican Republic	25–19	23–25	25–17	25–23		98–84	P2 P3
26 Aug	20:00	Mexico	3–0	Suriname	25–18	25–14	25–17			75–49	P2 P3
27 Aug	12:00	Chile	3–0	Suriname	25–15	25–13	25–14			75–42	P2 P3
27 Aug	20:00	Mexico	3–0	Dominican Republic	25–20	25–19	25–19			75–58	P2 P3
28 Aug	12:00	Dominican Republic	3–0	Suriname	25–16	25–14	25–20			75–50	P2 P3
28 Aug	20:00	Mexico	2–3	Chile	25–20	16–25	25–19	23–25	14–16	103–105	P2 P3

== Final round ==
=== Championship bracket ===
Quarterfinals
C1	Chile	2
B2	Colombia	3
C2	Mexico	3
A2	United States	1

Semifinals
A1	Venezuela	3
B2	Colombia	2
B1	Canada	1
C2	Mexico	3

Final
A1	Venezuela	3
C2	Mexico	1
3rd place
B2	Colombia	0
B1	Canada	3

=== 5th–8th places bracket ===
Classification 7–10
A3	Cuba	3
B4	Guatemala	0
C3	Dominican Republic	0
B3	Puerto Rico	3

Classification 5–8
A3	Cuba	0
C1	Chile	3
B3	Puerto Rico	1
A2	United States	3

5th place
C1	Chile	3
A2	United States	0
7th place
A3	Cuba	3
B3	Puerto Rico	1

=== 9th–12th places bracket ===
Classification 9–12
A4	Antigua and Barbuda	0
C3	Dominican Republic	3
C4	Suriname	3
B4	Guatemala	1

9th place
C3	Dominican Republic	3
C4	Suriname	2
11th place
A4	Antigua and Barbuda	0
B4	Guatemala	3

==== Classification 7th–10th ====
Date	Time		Score		Set 1	Set 2	Set 3	Set 4	Set 5	Total	Report
29 Aug	14:00	Cuba	3–0	Guatemala	25–23	25–21	25–23			75–67	P2 P3
29 Aug	16:00	Dominican Republic	0–3	Puerto Rico	20–25	18–25	19–25			57–75	P2 P3

==== Quarterfinals ====
Date	Time		Score		Set 1	Set 2	Set 3	Set 4	Set 5	Total	Report
29 Aug	18:00	Chile	2–3	Colombia	21–25	22–25	25–22	25–23	12–15	105–110	P2 P3
29 Aug	20:00	Mexico	3–1	United States	25–21	18–25	25–20	25–23		93–89	P2 P3

==== 9th–12th semifinals ====
Date	Time		Score		Set 1	Set 2	Set 3	Set 4	Set 5	Total	Report
30 Aug	10:00	Antigua and Barbuda	0–3	Dominican Republic	17–25	9–25	10–25			36–75	P2 P3
30 Aug	12:00	Suriname	3–1	Guatemala	25–21	29–27	17–25	27–25		98–98	P2 P3

==== 5th–8th semifinals ====
Date	Time		Score		Set 1	Set 2	Set 3	Set 4	Set 5	Total	Report
30 Aug	14:00	Cuba	0–3	Chile	20–25	21–25	20–25			61–75	P2 P3
30 Aug	16:00	Puerto Rico	1–3	United States	26–28	25–23	18–25	23–25		92–101	P2 P3

==== Semifinals ====
Date	Time		Score		Set 1	Set 2	Set 3	Set 4	Set 5	Total	Report
30 Aug	18:00	Venezuela	3–2	Colombia	25–22	28–26	19–25	15–25	15–12	102–110	P2 P3
30 Aug	20:00	Canada	1–3	Mexico	21–25	22–25	25–22	23–25		91–97	P2 P3

==== 11th place match ====
Date	Time		Score		Set 1	Set 2	Set 3	Set 4	Set 5	Total	Report
31 Aug	10:00	Antigua and Barbuda	0–3	Guatemala	10–25	16–25	17–25			43–75	P2 P3

==== 9th place match ====
Date	Time		Score		Set 1	Set 2	Set 3	Set 4	Set 5	Total	Report
31 Aug	12:00	Dominican Republic	3–2	Suriname	25–13	25–15	23–25	24–26	15–11	112–90	P2 P3

==== 7th place match ====
Date	Time		Score		Set 1	Set 2	Set 3	Set 4	Set 5	Total	Report
31 Aug	14:00	Cuba	3–1	Puerto Rico	25–20	19–25	25–23	25–21		94–89	P2 P3

==== 5th place match ====
Date	Time		Score		Set 1	Set 2	Set 3	Set 4	Set 5	Total	Report
31 Aug	16:00	Chile	3–0	United States	25–23	25–23	25–18			75–64	P2 P3

==== 3rd place match ====
Date	Time		Score		Set 1	Set 2	Set 3	Set 4	Set 5	Total	Report
31 Aug	18:00	Colombia	0–3	Canada	25–27	22–25	14–25			61–77	P2 P3

==== Final ====
Date	Time		Score		Set 1	Set 2	Set 3	Set 4	Set 5	Total	Report
31 Aug	20:00	Venezuela	3–1	Mexico	25–23	25–20	20–25	25–19		95–87	P2 P3

== Final standing ==
Rank	Team
1st place, gold medalist(s)	Venezuela
2nd place, silver medalist(s)	Mexico
3rd place, bronze medalist(s)	Canada
4	Colombia
5	Chile
6	United States
7	Cuba
8	Puerto Rico
9	Dominican Republic
10	Suriname
11	Guatemala
12	Antigua and Barbuda

2025 Men's Pan-American Cup champions

Venezuela
1st title

14-man roster
Jean Herrera, Héctor Mata, Emerson Rodríguez, Carlos Eduardo Beroes, Jesús Gómez, José Carrasco, Iván Fernández,
José Rafael González, David Martínez, Kevin Sánchez, Eduardo Vázquez, Ronald Fayola, Kevin Delgado and Willner Rivas
Head coach
Ruben Wolochin

== Individual awards ==
- Most valuable player
  Willner Rivas (VEN)
- Best setter
  Mason Greves (CAN)
- Best outside hitters
  Nolan Flexen (USA)
  Pelegrín Vargas (PUR)
- Best middle blockers
  Rafael Burgos (DOM)
  Cole Duncanson (CAN)
- Best opposite
  Vicente Parraguirre (CHI)
- Best scorer
  Vicente Parraguirre (CHI)
- Best server
  Axel Téllez (MEX)
- Best libero
  Rafael Almonte (DOM)
- Best digger
  Rafael Almonte (DOM)
- Best receiver
  Erik Siksna (CAN)

== See also ==
- 2025 Women's Pan-American Volleyball Cup
