= Edgardo Goás =

Puerto Rican volleyball player (born 1989)

Personal information
- Nationality: Puerto Rico
- Born: 27 January 1989 (age 37); San Juan, Puerto Rico
- Height: 1.97 m (6 ft 6 in)
- Weight: 95 kg (209 lb)
- Spike: 345 cm (136 in)
- Block: 330 cm (130 in)
- Education: Penn State University

Volleyball information
- Position: Setter
- Current club: Mets de Guaynabo
- Number: 1

Career
Years	Teams
2014	(Puerto Rico) Capitanes de Arecibo

National team
2014	Puerto Rico
Honours
Men's volleyball
Representing Puerto Rico
Pan-American Cup
Silver medal – second place	2017 Gatineau

Edgardo Goás (born 27 January 1989) is a Puerto Rican male volleyball player. He was part of the Puerto Rico men's national volleyball team at the 2014 FIVB Volleyball Men's World Championship in Poland. He played for Polish team Chemik Bydgoszcz.

== Clubs ==
- Capitanes de Arecibo (2012)
- Kokkola Tiikerit (2013)
- Stroitel Minsk (2013–2014)
- Capitanes de Arecibo (2014)
- Konya Belediye (2015)
- Capitanes de Arecibo (2015–2016)
- Indios de Mayaguez (2016–2017)
- Konya Belediye (2017)
- Luczniczka Bydgoszcz (2017–2018)
- Mets de Guaynabo (2018–2020)
