= Paul Viloria =

Venezuelan volleyball player (born 1995)

Personal information
- Nationality: Venezuelan
- Born: 30 June 1995 (age 31)
- Height: 201 cm (6 ft 7 in)
- Weight: 92 kg (203 lb)
- Spike: 343 cm (135 in)
- Block: 338 cm (133 in)

Career
Years	Teams
2015	Distrito Capital

National team
2015	Venezuela
Honours
Bolivarian Games
Gold medal – first place	2017 Santa Marta	Team

Paul Viloria (born 30 June 1995) is a Venezuelan male volleyball player. He is part of the Venezuela men's national volleyball team. On club level he plays for Distrito Capital.
