= Volleyball at the 2017 Bolivarian Games =

The volleyball tournaments, for the 2017 Bolivarian Games in Santa Marta, Colombia were held in the U-23 category between 12 and 23 November 2017 at Coliseo Municipal in Ciénaga, Magdalena.

== Participating teams ==
Men
- Bolivia
- Chile
- Colombia
- Dominican Republic
- Ecuador
- Panama
- Peru
- Venezuela

Women
- Bolivia
- Colombia
- Dominican Republic
- Peru
- Venezuela

== Medal table ==
* Host nation (Colombia)

Rank	Nation	Gold	Silver	Bronze	Total
1	Dominican Republic (DOM)	1	0	0	1
1	Venezuela (VEN)	1	0	0	1
3	Chile (CHI)	0	1	0	1
3	Peru (PER)	0	1	0	1
5	Colombia (COL)*	0	0	2	2
Totals (5 entries)		2	2	2	6

=== Medalists ===
Event	Gold	Silver	Bronze
Men	Venezuela Alonzo Mendoza; Efrain Hidalgo; Jesus Gómez; Jonathan Quijada; Jorge Carranza; Julio Pérez; Luis Rivas; Paul Viloria; Ronald Fayola; Ronald Martínez; Ronald Rea; Willner Rivas	Chile Esteban Villarreal; Gabriel Araya; Gianluca Borelli; Javier Corbella; Julian Zenteno; Lucas Lavin; Manfred Borgstedt; Matias Banda; Sebastian Castillo; Tomas Gago; Vicente Mardones; Vicente Ibarra	Colombia Alexander Bonilla; Carlos Llanos; Cristian Murillo; Gustavo Larrahondo; Ivan Hurtado; Jeyson Morelos; Julian Guerrero; Leandro Mejía; Luis Meza; Miguel Ariza; Raul Rivas; Sebastian Giraldo
Women	Dominican Republic Angelica Hinojosa; Brayelin Martínez; Camila de la Rosa; Gaila González; Geraldine González; Jineiry Martínez; Natalia Martínez; Vielka Peralta; Yanlis Féliz; Yokaty Pérez; Winifer Fernández; Larysmer Martínez	Peru Alexandra Machado; Andrea Urrutia; Ángela Leyva; Diana de la Peña; Diana Magallanes; Katherine Regalado; Kiara Montes; Leslie Leyva; Maguilaura Frias; Maricarmen Guerrero; Shiamara Almeida; Valeria Takeda	Colombia Adriana Durán; Ana Karina Olaya; Darlevis Mosquera; Emelys Martínez; Gisell Pérez; Juliana Toro; María Marín; María Sarmiento; María Caraballo; Melissa Montero; Valerin Carabali; Yarkled Veronica Pasos
