= Oscar García (volleyball) =

Venezuelan volleyball player (born 1995)

Oscar Enrique Garcia Marquina

Personal information
- Nationality: Venezuelan
- Born: 16 September 1995 (age 31)
- Height: 168 cm (5 ft 6 in)
- Weight: 76 kg (168 lb)
- Spike: 320 cm (126 in)
- Block: 315 cm (124 in)

Career
Years	Teams
2015	Varyná

National team
2015	Venezuela

Oscar Enrique Garcia Marquina (born 16 September 1995) is a Venezuelan male volleyball player. He is part of the Venezuela men's national volleyball team. At the club level he plays for Varyná.
