= Jacques Borgeaud =

Australian volleyball player (born 1991)

Personal information
- Nationality: Australian
- Born: 19 June 1991 (age 35); Sydney
- Height: 1.78 m (5 ft 10 in)
- Weight: 70 kg (154 lb)
- Spike: 321 cm (126 in)
- Block: 310 cm (122 in)

Volleyball information
- Position: Libero
- Number: 20 (2010); 18 (2015)

Career
Years	Teams
2015	(Canada) University of Regina

National team
2010-2015	Australia

Jacques Borgeaud (born 19 June 1991) is an Australian male volleyball player. He was part of the Australia men's national volleyball team. He competed with the Australian team at the 2015 FIVB Volleyball Men's World Cup and 2015 FIVB Volleyball World League. He plays for University of Regina.

== Clubs ==
- (Canada) University of Regina (2015)
