= Omar Hassan (volleyball) =

Egyptian volleyball player (born 1991)

Personal information
- Nationality: Egyptian
- Born: 4 April 1991 (age 35)
- Height: 191 cm (6 ft 3 in)
- Weight: 104 kg (229 lb)
- Spike: 333 cm (131 in)
- Block: 324 cm (128 in)

Volleyball information
- Number: 14 (national team)

Career
Years	Teams
2015	Army Club

National team
2015	Egypt

Omar Hassan (born 4 April 1991) is an Egyptian male volleyball player. He is part of the Egypt men's national volleyball team. On club level he plays for Army Club.
