= Ronald Fayola =

Venezuelan volleyball player (born 1995)

Personal information
- Full name: Ronald Daniel Fayola Hurtado
- Born: 20 June 1995 (age 31) Ciudad Bolívar, Venezuela
- Height: 1.98 m (6 ft 6 in)

Sport
- Country: Venezuela
- Sport: Volleyball
Medal record
Men's Pan-American Cup
Gold medal – first place	2025 León	Team
Bolivarian Games
Gold medal – first place	2017 Santa Marta	Team

Ronald Daniel Fayola Hurtado (Note: In this Spanish name, the first or paternal surname is Fayola and the second or maternal family name is Hurtado.) (born 20 June 1995) is a Venezuelan volleyball player. He competed in the 2020 Summer Olympics, held July–August 2021 in Tokyo.
