= Jonathan Quijada =

Venezuelan volleyball player (born 1995)

Personal information
- Nationality: Venezuelan
- Born: 25 September 1995 (age 31)
- Height: 203 cm (6 ft 8 in)
- Weight: 82 kg (181 lb)
- Spike: 346 cm (136 in)
- Block: 341

Career
Years	Teams
2015	Aragua

National team
2013-2015	Venezuela
Honours
Bolivarian Games
Gold medal – first place	2017 Santa Marta	Team

Jonathan Quijada (born 25 September 1995) is a Venezuelan male volleyball player. He is part of the Venezuela men's national volleyball team. On club level he plays for Aragua.
