= Eliécer Canelo =

Venezuelan volleyball player (born 1998)

Personal information
- Full name: Eliécer Alfonso Canelo Sánchez
- Born: 30 July 1998 (age 27) Maracay, Venezuela
- Height: 1.96 m (6 ft 5 in)

Sport
- Country: Venezuela
- Sport: Volleyball

Eliécer Alfonso Canelo Sánchez (Note: In this Spanish name, the first or paternal surname is Canelo and the second or maternal family name is Sánchez.) (born 30 July 1998) is a Venezuelan volleyball player. He competed in the 2020 Summer Olympics.
