= Cristian Poglajen =

Argentine volleyball player (born 1989)

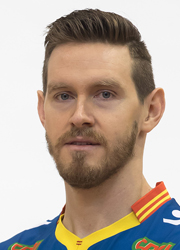
- Poglajen in 2018

Personal information
- Full name: Cristian Gabriel Poglajen
- Nickname: Polaco
- Born: 14 July 1989 (age 37); Rafael Castillo, Argentina
- Height: 1.94 m (6 ft 4 in)
- Weight: 93 kg (205 lb)
- Spike: 346 cm (136 in)
- Block: 320 cm (126 in)

Volleyball information
- Number: 6

Career
Years	Teams
2012-2013	(Argentina) Sarmiento Voley
2018	(Italy) Robur Ravenna
2021	(France) Stade Poitevin Volley Beach

National team
2012	Argentina
Honours
Men's volleyball
Representing Argentina
Olympic Games
Bronze medal – third place	2020 Tokyo	Team
Pan-American Cup
Gold medal – first place	2017 Gatineau

Cristian Gabriel Poglajen (born 14 July 1989 in Morón) is an Argentine volleyball player. He was part of the Argentine national volleyball team. He competed with the national team at the 2012 Summer Olympics in London and the 2016 Summer Olympics in Rio de Janeiro. He played with Sarmiento Voley in 2012.

== Clubs ==
- (Argentina) Sarmiento Voley (2012)

== See also ==
- Argentina at the 2012 Summer Olympics
