= Inside the Games =

Olympic news website

insidethegames.biz
- Website type: Sport
- Available in: English
- Headquarters: Spain
- Owner: Itg Media Dmcc
- Founder: Duncan Mackay
- Key people: Zhanna Abdulian; Marat Archegov; Ákos Tallar
- Website: www.insidethegames.biz
- Commercial: Yes
- Launched: 2005
- Current status: Active

Inside the Games (also known as insidethegames and insidethegames.biz) is an Olympic news website formerly edited by the British sports journalist Duncan Mackay. In 2023 it was sold to Vox Europe Investment Holding Ltd, with editorial work overseen by a new team based in Spain. In May 2024, control of the site was transferred to Itg Media Dmcc in Dubai.

== History ==
Mackay launched the site in 2005, originally as insidethegames.com, following the announcement that London has been chosen to host the 2012 Summer Olympics. The name of the site was changed to insidethegames.biz in 2009.

Inside the Games was based in Bletchley, near Bletchley Park.

Mackay was a winner of the 2009 Internet writer of the year award at the British Sports Journalism Awards by the Sports Journalists' Association for his work on insidethegames. The insidethegames site was involved in a court litigation in 2010 with Zulu Creative, a web design company previously used by insidethegames.

In addition to the Olympics, the site covers Paralympics, Commonwealth Games, and a variety of other sporting events. Inside the Games formed official media partnerships with the organizers of some of the sporting events that it covers.

The site was published by Dunsar Media until 31 October 2023. On 1 November 2023, the site was taken over by Vox Europe Investment Holding Ltd with Spanish sports journalist David Rubio becoming the Editor in Chief. The new investors have been linked with Umar Kremlev and pro-Vladimir Putin sports officials in Russia, with one director named as a former assistant to Kremlev - something denied by the new owners.

In May 2024, control of the site was transferred to ITG Media DMCC, a Dubai-registered entity.

After the change in ownership, the site published multiple exclusive interviews with members of the International Boxing Association which Kremlev is president of. ITG has cited and published IBA press releases, videos, and statements in detail and given prominence to statements from supporters of the IBA. In August 2024 the site published an editorial by IBA CEO Chris Roberts.

In 2024, the IOC refused ITG press accreditation to the Olympic Games in Paris due to ITG refusing to disclose ownership information.
