= Max Staples =

Australian volleyball player (born 1994)

Personal information
- Nationality: Australian
- Born: 27 July 1994 (age 32); Subiaco, Western Australia
- Height: 194 cm (6 ft 4 in)
- Weight: 83 kg (183 lb)
- Spike: 358 cm (141 in)
- Block: 345 cm (136 in)

Volleyball information
- Position: Outside Hitter
- Current club: Kladno volejbal cz
- Number: 9 (national team)

Career
| Years | Teams |
|---|---|
| 2015– | Fusion Rotterdam |
| 2018–19 | VK Jihostroj České Budějovice |
| 2019–20 | Hypo Tirol Innsbruck, Kladno volejbal.cz |

National team
| 2015– | Australia |

Max Staples (born 27 July 1994) is an Australian volleyball player. He is part of the Australia men's national volleyball team. On the club level he plays for VK Jihostroj České Budějovice, with this team he won the Czech Cup 2019 as well as the Extraliga 2018/2019 season.
