= Willner Rivas =

Venezuelan volleyball player (1995–2026)

Personal information
- Full name: Willner Enrique Rivas Quijada
- Born: 2 April 1995 La Guaira, Venezuela
- Died: 24 June 2026 (aged 31) La Guaira, Venezuela
- Height: 194 cm (6 ft 4 in)
- Weight: 81 kg (179 lb)
- Spike: 339 cm (133 in)
- Block: 336 cm (132 in)

Volleyball information

Career
- Years: Team
- 2013–2015 2015–2016 2016–2017 2017–2018 2018–2019 2019–2020 2020–2022 2022–2023 2023–2024 2024–2026: Distrito Capital; Lausanne UC; Afyon; Tannourine; Police Union; Gigantes del Sur; Police Union; Narbonne; Al-Qadisiya; Cisterna Volley

National team
- Years: Team
- 2015: Venezuela
Honours
Men's Pan-American Cup
| Gold medal – first place | 2025 León | Team |
Bolivarian Games
| Gold medal – first place | 2017 Santa Marta | Team |

Willner Enrique Rivas Quijada (2 April 1995 – 24 June 2026) was a Venezuelan professional volleyball player. He was part of the Venezuela national team. On club level he played for Distrito Capital.

Rivas and his family went missing following the collapse of their home in the 2026 Venezuelan earthquakes. On 5 July 2026, it was announced that Rivas was found dead with his family in their collapsed home.
