= Robert Oramas =

Venezuelan volleyball player (born 1984)

Personal information
- Full name: Robert Manuel Oramas Brizuela
- Nationality: Venezuela
- Born: 9 June 1984 (age 40); Guatire, Venezuela
- Height: 2.00 m (6 ft 7 in)

Sport
- Sport: Volleyball

Robert Manuel Oramas Brizuela (born Guatire, 9 June 1984) is a Venezuelan volleyball player. He competed in the 2020 Summer Olympics.
