= José Carrasco (volleyball) =

Venezuelan volleyball player (born 1989)

Personal information
- Nationality: Venezuelan
- Born: 20 May 1989 (age 37)
- Height: 1.95 m (6 ft 5 in)
- Weight: 89 kg (196 lb)
- Spike: 345 cm (136 in)
- Block: 347 cm (137 in)

Career
Years	Teams
2014	Yaracuy

National team
2014	Venezuela
Honours
Men's Pan-American Cup
Gold medal – first place	2025 León	Team

José Carrasco (born 20 May 1989) is a Venezuelan male volleyball player. He was part of the Venezuela men's national volleyball team at the 2014 FIVB Volleyball Men's World Championship in Poland. He played with Yaracuy.

== Clubs ==
- Yaracuy (2014)
