= Edson Valencia =

Venezuelan volleyball player (born 1987)

Personal information
- Full name: Edson Alberto Valencia González
- Born: 2 December 1987 (age 38) Santa Bárbara de Barinas, Venezuela
- Height: 2.00 m (6 ft 7 in)

Sport
- Country: Venezuela
- Sport: Volleyball

Edson Alberto Valencia González (Note: In this Spanish name, the first or paternal surname is Valencia and the second or maternal family name is González.) (born 2 December 1987) is a Venezuelan volleyball player. He competed in the 2020 Summer Olympics.
