= Héctor Mata =

Venezuelan volleyball player (born 1991)

Personal information
- Nationality: Venezuelan
- Born: 27 January 1991 (age 35)
- Height: 1.79 m (5 ft 10 in)
- Weight: 77 kg (170 lb)
- Spike: 310 cm (122 in)
- Block: 304 cm (120 in)

Career
Years	Teams
2014	Deportivo Anzoátegui

National team
2014	Venezuela
Honours
Representing Venezuela
Men's Pan-American Cup
Gold medal – first place	2025 León	Team
South American Championship
Silver medal – second place	2017 Santiago/Temuco	Team

Héctor Mata (born 27 January 1991) is a Venezuelan male volleyball player. He was part of the Venezuela men's national volleyball team at the 2014 FIVB Volleyball Men's World Championship in Poland. He played with Deportivo Anzoátegui.

== Clubs ==
- (Venezuela) Deportivo Anzoátegui (2014)
