= Emerson Rodríguez (volleyball) =

Venezuelan volleyball player (born 1993)

Personal information
- Full name: Emerson Alexander Rodríguez González
- Nationality: Venezuela
- Born: 2 February 1993 (age 33)
- Height: 2.04 m (6 ft 8 in)

Sport
- Sport: Volleyball
Medal record
Men's Pan-American Cup
Gold medal – first place	2025 León	Team

Emerson Alexander Rodríguez González (born 2 February 1993) is a Venezuelan volleyball player. He competed in the 2020 Summer Olympics.
