= 2019 in volleyball =

The following were volleyball-related events during 2019 throughout the world.

== Beach volleyball ==
=== World and continental beach volleyball events ===
- June 18–23: 2019 FIVB Beach Volleyball U21 World Championships in (Thailand) Udon Thani
  - Winners: Brazil (Renato Andrew Lima de Carvalho & Rafael Andrew Lima de Carvalho) (m) / Brazil (Victoria Lopes Pereira Tosta & Vitoria De Souza Rodrigues) (f)
- June 28 – July 7: 2019 Beach Volleyball World Championships in (Germany) Hamburg
  - Winners: Russia (Oleg Stoyanovskiy & Viacheslav Krasilnikov) (m) / Canada (Sarah Pavan & Melissa Humana-Paredes) (f)
- September 4–8: 2019 FIVB Beach Volleyball World Tour Finals in (Italy) Rome
  - Winners: Russia (Oleg Stoyanovskiy & Viacheslav Krasilnikov) (m) / Germany (Laura Ludwig & Margareta Kozuch) (f)
- September 18–22: 2019 FIVB Beach Volleyball Olympic Qualification Tournament in (China) Haiyang
  - Men: Italy and Latvia both qualified to compete at the 2020 Summer Olympics.
  - Women: Latvia and Spain both qualified to compete at the 2020 Summer Olympics.

=== 2019 FIVB Beach Volleyball World Tour ===
- January 2 – September 8: 2019 FIVB Beach Volleyball World Tour

==== 2019 World Tour Five Star BV events ====
- July 9–14: Five Star No. 1 in (Switzerland) Gstaad
  - Winners: Norway (Anders Mol & Christian Sørum) (m) / United States (April Ross & Alexandra Klineman) (f)
- July 31 – August 4: Five Star No. 2 (final) in (Austria) Vienna
  - Winners: Norway (Anders Mol & Christian Sørum) (m) / Canada (Sarah Pavan & Melissa Humana-Paredes) (f)

==== 2019 World Tour Four Star BV events ====
- January 2–6: Four Star No. 1 in (Netherlands) The Hague
  - Winners: Russia (Viacheslav Krasilnikov & Oleg Stoyanovskiy) (m) / Brazil (Ana Patricia Silva Ramos & Rebecca Cavalcanti Barbosa Silva) (f)
- March 11–16: Four Star No. 2 in (Qatar) Doha (men only)
  - Winners: Chile (Marco Grimalt & Esteban Grimalt)
- April 24–28: Four Star No. 3 in (China) Xiamen
  - Winners: Russia (Viacheslav Krasilnikov & Oleg Stoyanovskiy) (m) / Brazil (Ana Patricia Silva Ramos & Rebecca Cavalcanti Barbosa Silva) (f)
- May 15–19: Four Star #4 in (Brazil) Itapema
  - Winners: Norway (Anders Mol & Christian Sørum) (m) / United States (Alexandra Klineman & April Ross) (f)
- May 22–26: Four Star No. 5 in (China) Jinjiang, Fujian
  - Winners: Norway (Anders Mol & Christian Sørum) (m) / United States (Kerri Walsh Jennings & Brooke Sweat) (f)
- May 29 – June 2: Four Star No. 6 in (Czech Republic) Ostrava
  - Winners: Norway (Anders Mol & Christian Sørum) (m) / Brazil (Ágatha Bednarczuk & Eduarda Santos Lisboa) (f)
- June 12–16: Four Star No. 7 in (Poland) Warsaw
  - Winners: Brazil (Evandro Oliveira & Bruno Oscar Schmidt) (m) / Australia (Mariafe Artacho del Solar & Taliqua Clancy) (f)
- July 17–21: Four Star No. 8 in (Portugal) Espinho
  - Winners: Brazil (Alison Cerutti & Álvaro Morais Filho) (m) / Russia (Nadezda Makroguzova & Svetlana Kholomina) (f)
- July 24–28: Four Star No. 9 in (Japan) Tokyo
  - Winners: Norway (Anders Mol & Christian Sørum) (m) / Brazil (Ágatha Bednarczuk & Eduarda Santos Lisboa) (f)
- August 14–18: Four Star #10 in (Russia) Moscow
  - Winners: Latvia (Aleksandrs Samoilovs & Jānis Šmēdiņš) (m) / Switzerland (Anouk Vergé-Dépré & Joana Heidrich) (f)
- November 13–17: Four Star No. 11 in (Mexico) Chetumal

==== 2019 World Tour Three Star BV events ====
- March 6–10: Three Star No. 1 in Sydney
  - Winners: Chile (Marco Grimalt & Esteban Grimalt) (m) / Australia (Becchara Palmer & Nicole Laird) (f)
- April 30 – May 4: Three Star No. 2 in (Malaysia) Kuala Lumpur
  - Winners: Brazil (Alison Cerutti & Álvaro Morais Filho) (m) / Czech Republic (Barbora Hermannová & Markéta Sluková) (f)
- July 17–21: Three Star No. 3 in Edmonton
  - Winners: Switzerland (Nico Beeler & Marco Krattiger) (m) / Canada (Sarah Pavan & Melissa Humana-Paredes) (f)
- August 22–25: Three Star No. 4 in Jūrmala (men only)
  - Winners: Latvia (Aleksandrs Samoilovs & Jānis Šmēdiņš)
- October 30 – November 3: Three Star No. 5 in (China) Qinzhou
  - Winners: Switzerland (Adrian Heidrich & Mirco Gerson) (m) / Germany (Karla Borger & Julia Sude) (f)

==== 2019 World Tour Two Star BV events ====
- February 21–24: Two Star No. 1 in (Cambodia) Phnom Penh (women only)
  - Winners: Greece (Peny Karagkouni & Vassiliki Arvaniti)
- March 21–24: Two Star No. 2 in (Cambodia) Siem Reap (men only)
  - Winners: Austria (Christoph Dressler & Alexander Huber)
- May 15–19: Two Star No. 3 in (Turkey) Aydın
  - Winners: Poland (Maciej Rudol & Jakub Szalankiewicz) (m) / Russia (Maria Voronina & Mariia Bocharova) (f)
- May 30 – June 2: Two Star No. 4 in Nantong (women only)
  - Winners: China (WEN Shuhui & WANG Jingzhe)
- June 5–9: Two Star #5 in Nanjing (women only)
  - Winners: China (WEN Shuhui & WANG Jingzhe)
- July 4–7: Two Star #6 in Qidong, Jiangsu
  - Winners: Austria (Christoph Dressler & Alexander Huber) (m) / China (WEN Shuhui & WANG Jingzhe)
- August 22–25: Two Star #7 in Zhongwei (women only)
  - Winners: China (WEN Shuhui & WANG Jingzhe)

==== 2019 World Tour One Star BV events ====
- February 28 – March 3: One Star #1 in (India) Visakhapatnam
  - Winners: Germany (Armin Dollinger & Simon Kulzer) (m) / Czech Republic (Martina Bonnerová & Martina Maixnerova) (f)
- March 7–10: One Star #2 in (Cambodia) Kg Speu (men only)
  - Winners: Russia (Maxim Sivolap & Artem Yarzutkin)
- April 4–7: One Star #3 in (Cambodia) Battambang (women only)
  - Winners: United States (Lara Dykstra & Cassie House)
- April 8–11: One Star #4 in (Thailand) Satun
  - Winners: Ukraine (Denys Denysenko & Vladyslav Iemelianchyk) (m) / Chinese Taipei (Kou Nai-han & LIU Pi-hsin) (f)
- April 11–14: One Star No. 5 in (Malaysia) Langkawi
  - Winners: Russia (Daniil Kuvichka & Anton Kislytsyn) (m) / United States (Lara Dykstra & Cassie House) (f)
- April 18–21: One Star #6 in (Sweden) Gothenburg
  - Winners: Belarus (Aliaksandr Dziadkou & Pavel Piatrushka) (m) / Netherlands (Emi van Driel & Raïsa Schoon) (f)
- May 9–12: One Star #7 in (Vietnam) Tuần Châu (women only)
  - Winners: Russia (Ksenia Dabizha & Daria Rudykh)
- May 23–26: One Star #8 in (Philippines) Boracay
  - Winners: Thailand (Banlue Nakprakhong & Narongdet Kangkon) (m) / Japan (Satono Ishitsubo & Asami Shiba) (f)
- June 6–10: One Star #9 in Baden
  - Winners: Austria (Clemens Doppler & Alexander Horst) (m) / Austria (Katharina Schützenhöfer & Lena Plesiutschnig) (f)
- June 14–16: One Star No. 10 in Ios
  - Winners: France (Florian Gosselin & Jérémy Silvestre) (m) / Greece (Konstantina Tsopoulou & Dimitra Manavi) (f)
- July 11–14: One Star #11 in (South Korea) Daegu (women only)
  - Winners: Russia (Alexandra Moiseeva & Ekaterina Syrtseva)
- July 12–14: One Star No. 12 in (Italy) Alba Adriatica (women only)
  - Winners: Netherlands (Emi van Driel & Raïsa Schoon)
- July 18–21: One Star #13 in (South Korea) Ulsan (women only)
  - Event cancelled.
- July 25–28: One Star No. 14 in (Italy) Pinarella Di Cervia (men only)
  - Winners: Russia (Maksim Hudyakov & Igor Velichko)
- August 1–4: One Star #15 in Ljubljana
  - Winners: Slovenia (Tadej Bozenk & Vid Jakopin) (m) / Ukraine (Inna Makhno & Iryna Makhno) (f)
- August 1–4: One Star #16 in Malbork (men only)
  - Winners: Poland (Michal Kadziola & Marcin Ociepski)
- August 7–11: One Star #17 in (Liechtenstein) Vaduz
  - Winners: Austria (Moritz Fabian Kindl & Mathias Seiser) (m) / Netherlands (Emma Piersma & Pleun Ypma) (f)
- August 8–11: One Star #18 in Miguel Pereira
  - Winners: Brazil (Renato Andrew Lima de Carvalho & Rafael Andrew Lima de Carvalho) (m) / Brazil (Diana Bellas Romariz Silva & Andressa Cavalcanti Ramalho) (f)
- August 8–11: One Star #19 in (Hungary) Budapest
  - Winners: Italy (Samuele Cottafava & Jakob Windisch) (m) / Japan (Chiyo Suzuki & Yurika Sakaguchi) (f)
- August 15–18: One Star #20 in (Belgium) Knokke-Heist
  - Winners: France (Jérémy Silvestre & Timothée Platre) (m) / Colombia (Galindo Andrea & Galindo Claudia) (f)
- August 21–24: One Star #21 in (Rwanda) Rubavu District
  - Winners: Japan (Kensuke Shoji & Masato Kurasaka) (m) / Netherlands (Iris Reinders & Mexime van Driel) (f)
- August 24–27: One Star #22 in (Oman) Salalah (men only)
  - Winners: Denmark (Daniel Thomsen & Morten Overgaard)
- August 27–31: One Star #23 in (France) Montpellier (men only)
  - Winners: Netherlands (Dirk Boehlé & Stefan Boermans)
- August 28 – September 1: One Star #24 in Oslo (men only)
  - Winners: Norway (Anders Mol & Nils Gunnar Ringøen)
- October 1–4: One Star No. 25 in (Iran) Bandar Torkaman (men only)
  - Winners: Thailand (Nuttanon Inkiew & Sedtawat Padsawud)
- November 6–9: One Star #26 in (Israel) Tel Aviv
  - Winners: Italy (Samuele Cottafava & Jakob Windisch) (m) / Japan (Kaho Sakaguchi & Reika Murakami) (f)
- November 12–15: Aspire Beach Volleyball Cup (One Star #27) in (Qatar) Doha

== Volleyball ==
=== FIVB World Championships ===
- July 12–21: 2019 FIVB Volleyball Women's U20 World Championship in (Mexico) León, Guanajuato & Aguascalientes City
  - Japan defeated Italy, 3–2 in matches played, to win their first FIVB Volleyball Women's U20 World Championship title.
  - Russia took third place.
- July 18–27: 2019 FIVB Volleyball Men's U21 World Championship in (Bahrain) Manama
  - Iran defeated Italy, 3–2 in matches played, to win their first FIVB Volleyball Men's U21 World Championship title.
  - Brazil took third place.
- August 21–30: 2019 FIVB Volleyball Boys' U19 World Championship in (Tunisia) Tunis
  - Italy defeated Russia, 3–1 in matches played, to win their second FIVB Volleyball Boys' U19 World Championship title.
  - Argentina took third place.
- September 5–14: 2019 FIVB Volleyball Girls' U18 World Championship in (Egypt) Cairo
  - United States defeated Italy, 3–2 in matches played, to win their first FIVB Volleyball Girls' U18 World Championship title.
  - Brazil took third place.
- December 3–8: 2019 FIVB Volleyball Men's Club World Championship in (Brazil) Betim
- December 3–8: 2019 FIVB Volleyball Women's Club World Championship in (China) Shaoxing

=== FIVB World and Challenger Cups ===
- June 26–30: 2019 FIVB Volleyball Women's Challenger Cup in (Peru) Lima
  - Canada defeated the Czech Republic, 3–2 in matches played, to win their first FIVB Volleyball Women's Challenger Cup title.
  - Argentina took third place.
  - Note: Canada has qualified to compete at the 2020 FIVB Volleyball Women's Nations League.
- July 3–7: 2019 FIVB Volleyball Men's Challenger Cup in Ljubljana
  - Slovenia defeated Cuba, 3–0 in matches played, to win their first FIVB Volleyball Men's Challenger Cup title.
  - Belarus took third place.
  - Note: Slovenia has qualified to compete at the 2020 FIVB Volleyball Men's Nations League.
- September 14–29: 2019 FIVB Volleyball Women's World Cup in Japan
  - Champions: China; Second: United States; Third: Russia
- October 1–15: 2019 FIVB Volleyball Men's World Cup in Japan
  - Champions: Brazil; Second: Poland; Third: United States

=== FIVB Nations League ===
- May 21 – June 20: 2019 FIVB Volleyball Women's Nations League
  - July 3–7: Women's VNL Finals in Nanjing
    - The United States defeated Brazil, 3–2 in matches played, to win their second consecutive FIVB Volleyball Women's Nations League title.
    - China took third place.
- May 31 – June 30: 2019 FIVB Volleyball Men's Nations League
  - July 10–14: Men's VNL Finals in Chicago
    - Russia defeated the United States, 3–1 in matches played, to win their second consecutive FIVB Volleyball Men's Nations League title.
    - Poland took third place.

=== NORCECA ===
- January 4–6: 2019 Women's NORCECA Caribbean Series in San Juan (debut event)
  - Winners: Dominican Republic; Runner-up: Puerto Rico
- August 31 – September 8: 2019 Men's NORCECA Volleyball Championship in Winnipeg
  - Cuba defeated the United States, 3–1 in matches played, to win their 16th Men's NORCECA Volleyball Championship title.
  - Canada took third place.
- October 6–14: 2019 Women's NORCECA Volleyball Championship in (Puerto Rico) San Juan
  - The Dominican Republic defeated the United States, 3–2 in matches played, to win their second Women's NORCECA Volleyball Championship title.
  - Canada took third place.

=== CSV ===
National teams

- August 28 – September 1: 2019 Women's South American Volleyball Championship in Lima
  - Brazil defeated Colombia, 3–0 in matches played, to win their 13th consecutive and 21st overall Women's South American Volleyball Championship title.
  - Peru took third place.
- September 10–14: 2019 Men's South American Volleyball Championship in Santiago
  - Brazil defeated Argentina, 3–2 in matches played, to win their 27th consecutive and 32nd overall Men's South American Volleyball Championship title.
  - Chile took third place. Venezuela took fourth place.
  - Peru took fifth place. Colombia took sixth place.
  - Note 1: Brazil and Argentina both qualified to compete at the 2020 Summer Olympics.
  - Note 2: The other four teams here have qualified to compete at the 2020 South American Olympic Qualification Tournament.
- October 24–28: 2019 Girls' U16 South American Volleyball Championship in Lima
  - Champions: Chile; Second: Peru; Third: Paraguay; Fourth: Ecuador; Fifth: Bolivia

Club teams

- September 29, 2018 – February 13: 2018–19 Copa Libertadores (finals in (Brazil) Taubaté)
  - In the final, (Argentina) Bolívar Volley defeated (Brazil) SESC-RJ, 3–0, to win their 1st title.
  - (Brazil) SESI-SP took third place and (Brazil) Funvic Taubaté took fourth place.
- February 19–23: 2019 Women's South American Volleyball Club Championship in (Brazil) Belo Horizonte
  - (Brazil) Minas Tênis Clube defeated fellow Brazilian team, Dentil Praia, 3–0 in matches played, to win their second consecutive and fourth overall Women's South American Volleyball Club Championship title.
  - (Argentina) San Lorenzo de Almagro (Vòley Femenino) took third place.
  - Note: Minas Tênis Clube has qualified to compete at the 2019 FIVB Volleyball Women's Club World Championship.
- February 26 – March 2: 2019 Men's South American Volleyball Club Championship in (Brazil) Belo Horizonte
  - (Brazil) Sada Cruzeiro defeated (Argentina) UPCN San Juan, 3–1 in matches played, to win their fourth consecutive and sixth overall Men's South American Volleyball Club Championship title.
  - (Argentina) Club Obras Sanitarias took third place.
  - Note: Sada Cruzeiro has qualified to compete at the 2019 FIVB Volleyball Men's Club World Championship.

=== 2019 Pan-American Volleyball Cup events ===
- April 24–29: 2019 Boys' Youth Pan-American Volleyball Cup in Santo Domingo
  - Cuba defeated Mexico, 3–0 in matches played, to win their first Boys' Youth Pan-American Volleyball Cup title.
  - The Dominican Republic took third place.
  - Note: All teams mentioned here have qualified to compete at the 2019 FIVB Volleyball Boys' U19 World Championship.
- May 2–12: 2019 Men's Junior Pan-American Volleyball Cup in (Peru) Tarapoto
  - Cuba defeated Canada, 3–0 in matches played, to win their first Men's Junior Pan-American Volleyball Cup title.
  - Puerto Rico took third place.
  - Note 1: Puerto Rico has qualified to compete at the 2019 FIVB Volleyball Men's U21 World Championship.
  - Note 2: By rankings alone, Canada has qualified to compete at the 2019 FIVB Volleyball Men's U21 World Championship.
  - Note 3: Cuba has already qualified to compete at the 2019 FIVB Volleyball Men's U21 World Championship, from winning the 2018 NORCECA Championship.
- May 11–19: 2019 Women's Junior Pan-American Volleyball Cup in Lima
  - Cuba defeated the Dominican Republic, 3–2 in matches played, to win their first Women's Junior Pan-American Volleyball Cup title.
  - Peru took third place.
  - Note 1: Cuba has qualified to compete at the 2019 FIVB Volleyball Women's U20 World Championship.
  - Note 2: Both the Dominican Republic and Peru have qualified to compete at the 2019 FIVB Volleyball Women's U20 World Championship because of their world team rankings.
- May 19–27: 2019 Girls' Youth Pan-American Volleyball Cup in Durango City
  - Peru defeated Puerto Rico, 3–0 in matches played, to win their first Girls' Youth Pan-American Volleyball Cup title.
  - Mexico took third place.
  - Note 1: Both Puerto Rico and Mexico qualified to compete at the 2019 FIVB Volleyball Girls' U18 World Championship.
  - Note 2: Peru has already qualified to compete at the 2019 FIVB Volleyball Girls' U18 World Championship because of their second place finish at the 2018 Girls' Youth South American Volleyball Championship.
- June 14–22: 2019 Men's Pan-American Volleyball Cup in Colima City
  - Cuba defeated Argentina, 3–2 in matches played, to win their third Men's Pan-American Volleyball Cup title.
  - Mexico took third place.
- July 4–14: 2019 Women's Pan-American Volleyball Cup in (Peru) Trujillo & Chiclayo
  - The United States defeated the Dominican Republic, 3–0 in matches played, to win their third consecutive and sixth overall Women's Pan-American Volleyball Cup title.
  - Colombia took third place.

=== CEV ===
National teams

- May 25 – June 22: 2019 Women's European Volleyball League in Croatia
  - The Czech Republic defeated Croatia, 3–1 in matches played, to win their second Women's European Volleyball League title.
  - Belarus took third place.
  - Note: The Czech Republic and Croatia both qualified to compete at the 2019 FIVB Volleyball Women's Challenger Cup.
- May 25 – June 23: 2019 Men's European Volleyball League in Estonia
  - Turkey defeated Belarus, 3–0 in matches played, to win their first Men's European Volleyball League title.
  - The Netherlands took third place.
  - Note: Turkey and Belarus both qualified to compete at the 2019 FIVB Volleyball Men's Challenger Cup.
- August 23 – September 8: 2019 Women's European Volleyball Championship in Hungary, Poland, Slovakia, & Turkey
  - Serbia defeated Turkey, 3–2 in matches played, to win their second consecutive and third overall Women's European Volleyball Championship title.
  - Italy took third place.
- September 13–29: 2019 Men's European Volleyball Championship in Belgium, France, Netherlands, & Slovenia
  - Serbia defeated Slovenia, 3–1 in matches played, to win their third Men's European Volleyball Championship title.
  - Poland took third place.

Club teams

- October 9, 2018 – May 18, 2019: 2018–19 CEV Women's Champions League
  - (Italy) Igor Gorgonzola Novara defeated fellow Italian team, Imoco Volley Conegliano, 3–1 in matches played, to win their first CEV Women's Champions League title.
- October 9, 2018 – May 19, 2019: 2018–19 CEV Champions League
  - (Italy) Cucine Lube Civitanova defeated (Russia) VC Zenit-Kazan, 3–1 in matches played, to win their second CEV Champions League title.
- November 6, 2018 – March 26, 2019: 2018–19 Men's CEV Cup
  - (Italy) Diatec Trentino defeated (Turkey) Galatasaray İstanbul, 6–2 in matches played over 2 legs, to win their first Men's CEV Cup title.
- November 6, 2018 – March 26, 2019: 2018–19 Women's CEV Cup
  - (Italy) Unet E-Work Busto Arsizio defeated (Romania) CSM Volei Alba Blaj, 6–1 in matches played over 2 legs, to win their third Women's CEV Cup title.
- November 6, 2018 – March 27, 2019: 2018–19 CEV Challenge Cup
  - (Russia) Belogorie Belgorod defeated (Italy) Vero Volley Monza, 5–3 in matches played over 2 legs, to win their first CEV Challenge Cup title.
- November 6, 2018 – March 27, 2019: 2018–19 CEV Women's Challenge Cup
  - (Italy) Saugella Team Monza defeated (Turkey) Aydin BBSK, 6–1 in matches played over 2 legs, to win their first CEV Women's Challenge Cup title.

League events

- September 27, 2018 – March 10, 2019: 2018–19 Women's MEVZA Cup (final four at (Czech Republic) Olomouc)
  - (Czech Republic) VK UP Olomouc defeated (Slovenia) OK Nova KBM Branik, 3–1 in matches played, to win their first Women's MEVZA Cup title.
- September 29, 2018 – March 2, 2019: 2018–19 Baltic Men Volleyball League (final four at (Estonia) Tartu)
  - (Estonia) Bigbank Tartu defeated fellow Estonian team, Saaremaa, 3–2 in matches played, to win their third Baltic Men Volleyball League title.
  - (Estonia) Pärnu took third place.
- September 30, 2018 – March 16, 2019: 2018–19 MEVZA Cup (final four at (Austria) Bleiburg)
  - (Slovenia) ACH Volley Ljubljana defeated (Austria) Posojilnica Aich/Dob, 3–0 in matches played, to win their fifth MEVZA Cup title.
  - (Slovenia) Calcit Volley Kamnik took third place.
- October 6, 2018 – March 17, 2019: 2018–19 Women's Balti Liiga
  - (Lithuania) Alytus defeated (Estonia) Tartu Ülikool, 3–2 in matches played, in the final.
  - (Latvia) Riga VS took third place.
- February 8–10: NEVZA Club Championships in (Denmark) Ishøj
  - Men: 1st. (England) Polonia London, 2nd. (Denmark) BK Marienlyst, 3rd. (Denmark) Hvidovre VK, 4th. (Norway) Randaberg VK
  - Women: 1st. (Sweden) Engelholm VS, 2nd. (Norway) ToppVolley Norge, 3rd. (Denmark) Brøndby VK, 4th. (Norway) Oslo Volley

=== AVC ===
National teams

- July 13–21: 2019 Asian Women's U23 Volleyball Championship in Hanoi
  - China defeated North Korea, 3–0 in matches played, to win their second Asian Women's U23 Volleyball Championship title.
  - Vietnam took third place.
- August 3–11: 2019 Asian Men's U23 Volleyball Championship in (Myanmar) Naypyidaw
  - Chinese Taipei defeated India, 3–1 in matches played, to win their first Asian Men's U23 Volleyball Championship title.
  - Japan took third place.
- August 18–25: 2019 Asian Women's Volleyball Championship in Seoul
  - Japan defeated Thailand, 3–1 in matches played, to win their second consecutive and fifth overall Asian Women's Volleyball Championship title.
  - South Korea took third place.
- September 13–21: 2019 Asian Men's Volleyball Championship in Tehran
  - Iran defeated Australia, 3–0 in matches played, to win their third Asian Men's Volleyball Championship title.
  - Japan took third place.

Club teams

- April 18–26: 2019 Asian Men's Club Volleyball Championship in (Chinese Taipei) Taipei
  - (Iran) Shahrdari Varamin VC defeated (Japan) Panasonic Panthers, 3–2 in matches played, to win their second Asian Men's Club Volleyball Championship title.
  - (Qatar) Al Rayyan took third place.
  - Note: Shahrdari Varamin has qualified to compete at the 2019 FIVB Volleyball Men's Club World Championship.
- April 27 – May 5: 2019 Asian Women's Club Volleyball Championship in (China) Tianjin
  - (China) Tianjin Bohaibank defeated (Thailand) Generali Supreme Chonburi-E.Tech, 3–1 in matches played, in the final.
  - (Japan) Hisamitsu Springs took third place.
  - Note: Tianjin Bohaibank has qualified to compete at the 2020 FIVB Volleyball Women's Club World Championship.

=== AVA ===
- January 27 – February 4: 2019 Women's Arab volleyball clubs championship in (Egypt) Cairo
  - In the final, (Tunisia) CS Sfaxien defeated (Egypt) Al Ahly, 3–0, to win their 1st title.
- February 15–23: 2019 Arab Clubs Championship (Tunisia) Tunis
  - In the final, (Qatar) Al Rayyan SC defeated (Tunisia) ES Tunis, 3–2, to win their 2nd title.
  - Police SC Qatar took third place and (Algeria) MC Alger took fourth place.

=== CAVB ===
National teams

- July 5–15: 2019 Women's African Volleyball Championship in (Egypt) Cairo
  - Cameroon defeated Kenya, 3–2 in matches played, to win their second consecutive Women's African Volleyball Championship title.
  - Senegal took third place.
- July 19–29: 2019 Men's African Volleyball Championship in Tunis
  - Tunisia defeated Cameroon, 3–2 in matches played, to win their second consecutive and tenth overall Men's African Volleyball Championship title.
  - Algeria took third place.
  - Note: Tunisia has qualified to compete at the 2020 FIVB Volleyball Men's Challenger Cup.

Club teams

- March 16–25: 2019 Women's African Clubs Championship in (Egypt) Cairo
  - (Egypt) Al Ahly defeated (Tunisia) Carthage, 3–1 in matches played, to win their second consecutive and tenth overall Women's African Volleyball Clubs Championship title.
  - Kenya Pipelines took third place.
- April 1–10: 2019 African Clubs Championship in (Egypt) Cairo
  - (Egypt) Al Ahly defeated fellow Egyptian team, Smouha SC, 3–0 in matches played, to win their third consecutive and 14th overall African Clubs Championship title.
  - (Libya) Ahli Tripoli took third place.
