= Tunisian Women's Volleyball Super Cup =

- Current season, competition or edition: 2022–23 Tunisian Women's Volleyball Super Cup
- Sport: Volleyball
- Founded: 2003; 23 years ago
- No. of teams: 2
- Country: Tunisia
- Continent: Africa (CAVB)
- Most recent champions: Club Sfaxien (2023)
- Most titles: Club Sfaxien (6 titles)
- Level on pyramid: 1
- Website: ftvb.org

The Tunisian Women's Volleyball Super Cup began with 2002–03 season. It is organized by Tunisian Volleyball Federation. Clubs of all divisions takes part in this competition.

== Titles ==
Season	Winner	Score	Finalist	The sets	Place
2002–03	CO Kélibia	–			
2003–04	cancelled				
2004–05	Club Sfaxien	–			
2005–06	cancelled				
2006–07	Club Sfaxien	–			
2007–08	Al Hilal Sports	–			
2008–09	US Carthage	–			
2009–10	Club Sfaxien	–			
2010–11	cancelled				
2011–12	cancelled				
2012–13	cancelled				
2013–14	cancelled				
2014–15	cancelled				
2015–16	cancelled				
2016–17	CF Carthage	3 – 0	Club Sfaxien	25–23, 25–15, 25–23	Béja
2017–18	Club Sfaxien	–	CF Carthage		
2018–19	Club Sfaxien	3 – 1	CF Carthage	25–16, 11–25, 26–24, 25–21	Bizerte
2019–20	CF Carthage	3 – 1	Club Sfaxien	25–20, 18–25, 25–23, 25–14	Sidi Bou Said
2020–21	CF Carthage	3 – 0	Club Sfaxien	25–14, 25–15, 25–11	Radès
2021–22	CF Carthage	3 – 0	Club Africain	25–23, 25–20, 25–20	La Goulette
2022–23	Club Sfaxien	3 – 2	CF Carthage	25–23, 17–25, 25–20, 23–25, 15–13	Radès

=== Performance by club ===
Rk	Club	Cups	Season
1	Club Sfaxien	6	2005, 2007, 2010, 2018, 2019, 2023
2	CF Carthage	4	2017, 2020, 2021
3	CO Kélibia	1	2003
3	Al Hilal Sports	1	2008
3	US Carthage	1	2009

== See also ==
- Tunisian Men's Volleyball Super Cup
