= Lebanese Women's Volleyball League =

- Current season, competition or edition: 2025–26 Lebanese League
- Sport: Volleyball
- First season: 1961; 65 years ago
- Administrator: LVF
- No. of teams: 12 teams
- Country: Lebanon
- Confederation: AVC
- Continent: Asia
- Most recent champion: Al-Qalamoun (17th titles) (2024–25)
- Most titles: Al-Qalamoun (17 titles)
- Broadcaster: MTV Lebanon
- Level on pyramid: Level 1
- Relegation to: National 2
- Domestic cup: No Cups held
- International cups: AVC Champions League; Arab Clubs Championship

The Lebanese Women's First Division Volleyball League (Arabic: دوري الدرجة الاولى اللبناني لكرة الطائرة سيدات) is the premier women's volleyball competition in Lebanon. Sanctioned and organized by the Lebanese Volleyball Federation, it represents the highest tier of women's volleyball in the country.

Founded in 1961–62, the league was introduced nearly a decade after the establishment of the men's championship. The competition was held from the 1961–62 season until 1967–68, during which clubs such as AL Anwar El Jedeideh, Al Kahraba Beirut, and Apotres Jounieh emerged as the dominant teams.

Competition was suspended from 1975 to 1990 as a result of the Lebanese Civil War. Following the end of the conflict, the Lebanese Volleyball Federation revived the league for the 1995–96 season. Since its return, the championship has been contested annually, with 12 clubs from across Lebanon competing each season for the national title.

== Titles by Clubs ==
| Rank | Team | Titles |
|---|---|---|
| 1 | Al-Qalamoun | 17 |
| 2 | AL Anwar El Jedeideh | 4 |
| 3 | Mtein Club | 3 |
| 4 | Byblos VC | 1 |
| 4 | Kfar Abida VC | 1 |
| 4 | Al Kahraba Beirut | 1 |
| 4 | Apotres Jounieh | 1 |
| 4 | Cornet Chahwan | 1 |
| 4 | Hafroun Club | 1 |

== Winners list ==
| Season | Champion |
|---|---|
| 2025–26 | |
| 2024–25 | Al-Qalamoun |
| 2023–24 | Kfar Abida |
| 2022–23 | Byblos |
| 2021–22 | Al-Qalamoun |
| 2018–19 | Mtein Club |
| 2017–18 | Mtein Club |
| 2016–17 | Al-Qalamoun |
| 2015–16 | Mtein Club |

| Season | Champion |
|---|---|
| 2014–15 | Al-Qalamoun |
| 2012–13 | Al-Qalamoun |
| 2011–12 | Al-Qalamoun |
| 2010–11 | AL Anwar El Jedeideh |
| 2009–10 | AL Anwar El Jedeideh |
| 2008–09 | Al-Qalamoun |
| 2006–07 | Al-Qalamoun |
| 2005–06 | Al-Qalamoun |
| 2004–05 | Al-Qalamoun |
| 2003–04 | Hafroun Club |
| 2002–03 | Al-Qalamoun |

| Season | Champion |
|---|---|
| 2001–02 | Al-Qalamoun |
| 2000–01 | Al-Qalamoun |
| 1999–00 | Al-Qalamoun |
| 1998–99 | Al-Qalamoun |
| 1997–98 | Al-Qalamoun |
| 1996–97 | Al-Qalamoun |
| 1995–96 | Cornet Chahwan |
| 1967–68 | AL Anwar El Jedeideh |
| 1966–67 | Apotres Jounieh |
| 1964–65 | AL Anwar El Jedeideh |
| 1961–62 | Al Kahraba Beirut |

Sources :
