= Espérance Sportive de Tunis (women's volleyball) =

Tunisian volleyball club

- Full name: Espérance Sportive de Tunis Volleyball
- Short name: EST
- Founded: 1956
- Ground: Salle Mohamed-Zouaoui, Tunis
- Chairman: (Tunisia) Hamdi Meddeb
- Manager: (Tunisia) Mohamed Ali Hentati
- Captain: Mariem Brik
- League: Tunisian Volleyball League
- 2022–23: 4th Place
- Website: Club home page

Uniforms
Home	Away

The Espérance Sportive de Tunis Women's Volleyball (Arabic: الترجي الرياضي التونسي للكرة الطائرة للسيدات, often referred to as EST) is one of Espérance Sportive de Tunis club's sections that represent the club in domestic competitions in Tunisia as well as in international Women's volleyball competitions, the club team section based in capital Tunis since the year 1956. Following a decline in results in the 1990s as well as poor funding the club was dissolved in 1994, but after almost 27 years the Espérance Sportive de Tunis Administration Decided to revive again the team in 2021, The team Win the Tunisian Second Division in 2021/22 and gain promotion to play again in the Tunisian Women's First tier League.

== Current squad 2025/26 ==
No.	Name	Nationality	Position	Height (cm)	Birth Year
10	Ritej Bouassida	Tunisia	Setter	171	2008
9	Rana Chebbi	Tunisia	Opposite	181	2002
2	Maysa Ben Jouda	Tunisia	Outside Hitter	—	—
11	Maram Bouguerra	Tunisia	Outside Hitter	167	2009
12	Nour Hj	Tunisia	Outside Hitter	—	—
13	Nada Chkili	Tunisia	Outside Hitter	—	—
15	Souha Abidy	Tunisia	Outside Hitter	—	—
16	Aidachi Agüero Aguilera	Cuba	Outside Hitter	179	1999
19	Fatma Ghorbel	Tunisia	Outside Hitter	—	1999
7	Aida Ben Faiza	Tunisia	Middle-blocker	180	1986
4	Souleyma Mbarek	Tunisia	Libero	167	2007
5	Farah Gharbi	Tunisia	Universal	—	2004
—	Nadia Hentati	Tunisia	Universal	170	2006

== Technical and managerial staff ==
Name	Role	Nationality
Hamdi Meddeb	Manager	Tunisian
Mohamed Ali Hentati	Coach	Tunisian
Vaccant	Assistant Coach	Tunisian

== Honours ==
=== National achievements ===
- Tunisian League :

Winners (5x titles) : 1969–70, 1968–69, 1967–68, 1964–65, 1963–64

- Tunisian Cup :

Winners (2x cups) : 1974–75, 1968–69
Runners up (11x vice champions) : 1964–65, 1966–67, 1967–68, 1970–71, 1983–84, 1985–86, 1986–87, 1987–88, 1989–90, 1990–91, 1991–92

- Tunisian Second League :

Winners (1x titles) : 2021–22

== Head coaches ==
This is a list of the senior team's head coaches in the recent years.

Dates	Name
2021→2022	(Tunisia) Adel ben Romdhane
2022→2023	(Tunisia) Hatem Tajouri
2023→Present	(Tunisia) Mohamed Ali Hentati

As of 2023
