= Tunisian Women's Volleyball League =

- Current season, competition or edition: 2025–26 Tunisian Women's Volleyball League
- Sport: Volleyball
- Founded: 1959; 67 years ago
- No. of teams: 10
- Country: Tunisia
- Continent: Africa (CAVB)
- Most recent champion: CF Carthage (2025–26)
- Most titles: Club Africain; Al Hilal Sports (13 titles)
- Level on pyramid: 1
- Related competitions: African Club Championship
- Website: ftvb.org

The Tunisian Women's Volleyball League is the highest tier of women's volleyball in Tunisia and it is organized by Tunisian Volleyball Federation. The League is currently contested by 10 clubs.

The regular season is contested by 10 teams, playing each other twice, once at home and once away from home. After the regular season, the four best-placed teams enter the play-offs and the last six teams enter the play-out.

== 2023–24 Nationale A teams ==
List of The Tunisian Women's Volleyball Clubs
Team	City	Arena	Founded	Colours	Head coach
Al Hilal sports	Tunis	Al Hilal sports Hall	1945		(Tunisia) Khoubaib Hannachi
Avenir de Hammam Chott	Hammam Chott	Hammam Chott Hall	1995		(Tunisia) Mohamed Salah Ben Younes
Avenir de La Marsa	La Marsa	La Marsa Hall	1944		(Tunisia) Mohammed Touati
Boumhel Bassatine Sport	Bou Mhel el-Bassatine	Bou Mhel el-Bassatine Hall	1999		(Tunisia) Amine Basdouri
Club Africain	Tunis	Chérif-Bellamine Hall	1958		(Tunisia) Rached Ben Krid
CF Carthage	Carthage	Carthage Hall	2011		(Tunisia) Kamel Rekaya
CO Kélibia	Kélibia	Aissa Ben Nasr Hall	1957		(Tunisia) Mohamed Messelmani
Club Sfaxien	Sfax	Raed Bejaoui Hall	1964		(Tunisia) Samih Barhoumi
Espérance de Tunis	Tunis	Mohammed Zouaoui Sports Hall	1956		(Tunisia) Mohamed Ali Hentati
US Carthage	Carthage	Carthage Hall	1994		(Tunisia) Riadh Ben Romdhane

== List of champions ==
- 1959 : Club Africain
- 1960 : Alliance Sportive
- 1961 : Alliance Sportive
- 1962 : Club sportif des cheminots
- 1963 : Club sportif des cheminots
- 1964 : Espérance de Tunis
- 1965 : Espérance de Tunis
- 1966 : Al Hilal Sports
- 1967 : Al Hilal Sports
- 1968 : Espérance de Tunis
- 1969 : Espérance de Tunis
- 1970 : Espérance de Tunis
- 1971 : Jeunesse sportive d'El Omrane
- 1972 : Jeunesse sportive d'El Omrane
- 1973 : Jeunesse sportive d'El Omrane
- 1974 : Avenir de La Marsa
- 1975 : Avenir de La Marsa
- 1976 : Avenir de La Marsa
- 1977 : Avenir de La Marsa
- 1978 : Avenir de La Marsa
- 1979 : Avenir de La Marsa.
- 1980 : Club Africain
- 1981 : Club Africain
- 1982 : Club Africain
- 1983 : Club Africain
- 1984 : Club Africain
- 1985 : Club Africain
- 1986 : Club Africain
- 1987 : Club Africain
- 1988 : Al Hilal Sports
- 1989 : Al Hilal Sports
- 1990 : Club Africain
- 1991 : Club Africain
- 1992 : Al Hilal Sports
- 1993 : Club Africain
- 1994 : Club Africain
- 1995 : Al Hilal Sports
- 1996 : Al Hilal Sports
- 1997 : Al Hilal Sports
- 1998 : Ariana University
- 1999 : Club Sfaxien
- 2000 : Al Hilal Sports
- 2001 : Al Hilal Sports
- 2002 : Al Hilal Sports
- 2003 : Club Sfaxien
- 2004 : Club Sfaxien
- 2005 : Al Hilal Sports
- 2006 : Club Sfaxien
- 2007 : Al Hilal Sports
- 2008 : US Carthage
- 2009 : Club Sfaxien
- 2010 : Club Sfaxien
- 2011 : US Carthage
- 2012 : Club Sfaxien
- 2013 : CF Carthage
- 2014 : CF Carthage
- 2015 : CF Carthage
- 2016 : CF Carthage
- 2017 : CF Carthage
- 2018 : CF Carthage
- 2019 : Club Sfaxien
- 2020 : CF Carthage
- 2021 : CF Carthage
- 2022 : CF Carthage
- 2023 : CF Carthage
- 2024 : CF Carthage
- 2025 : CF Carthage
- 2026 : CF Carthage

== Titles by club ==
Rk	Club	Titles #	Winning years
1	Club Africain	13	1959, 1980, 1981, 1982, 1983, 1984, 1985, 1986, 1987, 1990, 1991, 1993, 1994
=	Al Hilal Sports	13	1966, 1967, 1988, 1989, 1992, 1995, 1996, 1997, 2000, 2001, 2002, 2005, 2007
3	CF Carthage	13	2013, 2014, 2015, 2016, 2017, 2018, 2020, 2021, 2022, 2023, 2024, 2025, 2026
4	Club Sfaxien	8	1999, 2003, 2004, 2006, 2009, 2010, 2012, 2019
5	Avenir de La Marsa	6	1974, 1975, 1976, 1977, 1978, 1979
6	Espérance de Tunis	5	1964, 1965, 1968, 1969, 1970
7	JS Omrane	3	1971, 1972, 1973
8	US Carthage	2	2008, 2011
=	Alliance Sportive	2	1960, 1961
=	CS Cheminots	2	1962, 1963
11	Ariana University	1	1998

== See also ==
- Tunisian Men's Volleyball League
