= 2019 Women's African Volleyball Clubs Championship =

Tournament details
- Host country: Egypt
- City: Cairo
- Dates: 16–25 March
- Teams: 17 (from 1 confederation)

Final positions
- Champions: (Egypt) Al Ahly SC (10th title)
- Runners-up: (Tunisia) CF de Carthage

Tournament awards
- MVP: Aya Elshamy (Al Ahly SC)

The 2019 Women's African Volleyball Clubs Championship was the 30th edition of the tournament organized by the African Volleyball Confederation (CAVB). It took place between 16 and 25 of March and was held in Cairo, Egypt.

Al Ahly SC started the competition as defending champions and reached the finals, CF de Carthage where they won 3–1 Against CF de Carthage. It was the tenth time Al Ahly won the Women's African Volleyball Clubs Championship title.

== Teams ==
The following 17 teams competed in the tournament:

- (Egypt) Al Ahly SC
- Nigeria Customs
- (Cameroon) Canon Yaoundé
- (Burkina Faso) US des Forces Armées
- (Tunisia) CF de Carthage
- (Egypt) Alexandria Sporting Club
- (Kenya) KCB
- (Republic of the Congo) DGSP
- Kenya Pipeline
- (Cameroon) FAP
- (Rwanda) Revenue
- (Egypt) Egyptian Shooting Club
- (Algeria) Groupement Sportif des Pétroliers
- (Egypt) El Shams SC
- Kenya Prisons
- (Ivory Coast) ASEC Mimosas
- (Uganda) Nkumba

== Group stage ==
Group winners and runners-up advance to the quarterfinals, groups thirds and fourths advance to the 8th–16th quarterfinals and groups fifth placed teams advance to the 17th–19th play-offs.

=== Pool A ===
Pos	Team	Pld	W	L	Pts	SW	SL	SR	SPW	SPL	SPR	Qualification
1	(Egypt) Al Ahly SC	3	3	0	9	9	0	MAX	225	107	2.103	1st–8th quarterfinals
2	Nigeria Customs	3	2	1	6	6	4	1.500	204	212	0.962	1st–8th quarterfinals
3	(Cameroon) Canon Yaoundé	3	1	2	3	3	6	0.500	169	204	0.828	9th–16th quarterfinals
4	(Burkina Faso) US des Forces Armées	3	0	3	0	1	9	0.111	165	240	0.688	9th–16th quarterfinals

Date	Time		Score		Set 1	Set 2	Set 3	Set 4	Set 5	Total	Report
16 Mar	15:00	Nigeria Customs	3–0	(Burkina Faso) US des Forces Armées	25–17	25–9	25–3			75–29	
17 Mar	20:00	Canon Yaoundé (Cameroon)	0–3	(Egypt) Al Ahly SC	14–25	15–25	11–25			40–75	
18 Mar	19:00	Al Ahly SC (Egypt)	3–0	(Burkina Faso) US des Forces Armées	25–12	25–14	25–12			75–38	
19 Mar	15:00	Canon Yaoundé (Cameroon)	1–3	Nigeria Customs	18–25	18–25	26–24	17–25		79–99	
20 Mar	14:00	US des Forces Armées (Burkina Faso)	0–3	(Cameroon) Canon Yaoundé	19–25	22–25	27–29			68–79	
20 Mar	19:00	Nigeria Customs	0–3	(Egypt) Al Ahly SC	14–25	19–25	10–25			43–75	

==== Final ====
Date	Time		Score		Set 1	Set 2	Set 3	Set 4	Set 5	Total	Report
25 Mar	18:00	Al Ahly SC (Egypt)	3–1	(Tunisia) CF de Carthage	21–25	25–15	25–11	25–19		96–70	
