= 2018 Women's African Volleyball Clubs Championship =

Tournament details
- Host country: Egypt
- City: Cairo
- Dates: 4–15 March
- Teams: 19 (from 1 confederation)

Final positions
- Champions: (Egypt) Al Ahly SC (9th title)
- Runners-up: (Tunisia) CF de Carthage

Tournament awards
- MVP: Aya Elshamy (Al Ahly SC)
- Best Setter: Amina Mansour (CF de Carthage)
- Best OH: Khloud Genhani (CF de Carthage)
- Best MB: Trizah Atouka (Kenya Pipeline)
- Best Libero: Mariam Moustafa (Al Ahly SC)

Tournament statistics
- Matches played: 62

The 2018 Women's African Volleyball Clubs Championship was the 29th edition of the tournament organized by the African Volleyball Confederation (CAVB). It took place between 4 and 15 of March and was held in Cairo, Egypt.

CF de Carthage started the competition as defending champions and reached the finals, where they were defeated 3–0 by Al Ahly SC. It was the ninth time Al Ahly won the Women's African Volleyball Clubs Championship title.

== Teams ==
The following 19 teams competed in the tournament:

- (Egypt) Al Ahly SC
- (Ivory Coast) ASEC Mimosas
- (Burkina Faso) AS Douanes
- (Botswana) BDF 6
- (Cameroon) Bafia VB
- (Tunisia) CF de Carthage
- (Republic of the Congo) DGSP
- (Cameroon) FAP
- (Zimbabwe) Harare City
- (Cameroon) INJS
- Kenya Pipeline
- Nigeria Customs
- (Cameroon) Nyong et Kelle
- (Algeria) Nedjmet Riadhi Chlef
- (Uganda) Nkumba
- Kenya Prisons
- (Rwanda) Revenue
- (Egypt) El Shams
- (Uganda) Vision

== Group stage ==
Group winners and runners-up advance to the quarterfinals, groups thirds and fourths advance to the 8th–16th quarterfinals and groups fifth placed teams advance to the 17th–19th play-offs.

=== Pool A ===
| Pos | Team | Pld | W | L | Pts | SW | SL | SR | SPW | SPL | SPR | Qualification |
|---|---|---|---|---|---|---|---|---|---|---|---|---|
| 1 | (Egypt) Al Ahly SC | 3 | 3 | 0 | 9 | 9 | 0 | MAX | 225 | 107 | 2.103 | 1st–8th quarterfinals |
| 2 | (Rwanda) Revenue | 3 | 2 | 1 | 6 | 6 | 4 | 1.500 | 204 | 212 | 0.962 | 1st–8th quarterfinals |
| 3 | (Uganda) Nkumba | 3 | 1 | 2 | 3 | 3 | 6 | 0.500 | 169 | 204 | 0.828 | 9th–16th quarterfinals |
| 4 | (Cameroon) Nyong et Kelle | 3 | 0 | 3 | 0 | 1 | 9 | 0.111 | 165 | 240 | 0.688 | 9th–16th quarterfinals |

| Date | Time | | Score | | Set 1 | Set 2 | Set 3 | Set 4 | Set 5 | Total | Report |
|---|---|---|---|---|---|---|---|---|---|---|---|
| 6 Mar | 17:00 | Al Ahly SC (Egypt) | 3–0 | (Uganda) Nkumba | 25–7 | 25–12 | 25–16 | | | 75–35 | Report |
| 7 Mar | 16:00 | Revenue (Rwanda) | 3–1 | (Cameroon) Nyong et Kelle | 25–18 | 15–25 | 25–21 | 25–14 | | 90–78 | Report |
| 8 Mar | 19:00 | Al Ahly SC (Egypt) | 3–0 | (Rwanda) Revenue | 25–13 | 25–10 | 25–16 | | | 75–39 | Report |
| 9 Mar | 14:00 | Nyong et Kelle (Cameroon) | 0–3 | (Uganda) Nkumba | 22–25 | 18–25 | 14–25 | | | 54–75 | Report |
| 10 Mar | 14:00 | Nkumba (Uganda) | 0–3 | (Rwanda) Revenue | 18–25 | 22–25 | 19–25 | | | 59–75 | Report |
| 10 Mar | 19:00 | Nyong et Kelle (Cameroon) | 0–3 | (Egypt) Al Ahly SC | 8–25 | 15–25 | 10–25 | | | 33–75 | Report |

=== Pool B ===
| Pos | Team | Pld | W | L | Pts | SW | SL | SR | SPW | SPL | SPR | Qualification |
|---|---|---|---|---|---|---|---|---|---|---|---|---|
| 1 | (Tunisia) CF de Carthage | 4 | 4 | 0 | 12 | 12 | 0 | MAX | 300 | 173 | 1.734 | 1st–8th quarterfinals |
| 2 | (Cameroon) Bafia VB | 4 | 3 | 1 | 8 | 9 | 5 | 1.800 | 292 | 295 | 0.990 | 1st–8th quarterfinals |
| 3 | (Algeria) Nedjmet Riadhi Chlef | 4 | 2 | 2 | 6 | 6 | 7 | 0.857 | 275 | 281 | 0.979 | 9th–16th quarterfinals |
| 4 | (Zimbabwe) Harare City | 4 | 1 | 3 | 3 | 3 | 10 | 0.300 | 237 | 312 | 0.760 | 9th–16th quarterfinals |
| 5 | (Botswana) BDF 6 | 4 | 0 | 4 | 1 | 4 | 12 | 0.333 | 323 | 366 | 0.883 | 17th–19th play-offs |

| Date | Time | | Score | | Set 1 | Set 2 | Set 3 | Set 4 | Set 5 | Total | Report |
|---|---|---|---|---|---|---|---|---|---|---|---|
| 6 Mar | 10:00 | Harare City (Zimbabwe) | 3–1 | (Botswana) BDF 6 | 18–25 | 25–21 | 25–20 | 25–21 | | 93–87 | Report |
| 6 Mar | 11:00 | Nedjmet Riadhi Chlef (Algeria) | 0–3 | (Tunisia) CF de Carthage | 12–25 | 15–25 | 13–25 | | | 40–75 | Report |
| 7 Mar | 13:00 | CF de Carthage (Tunisia) | 3–0 | (Zimbabwe) Harare City | 25–17 | 25–20 | 25–9 | | | 75–46 | Report |
| 7 Mar | 19:00 | Bafia VB (Cameroon) | 3–0 | (Algeria) Nedjmet Riadhi Chlef | 25–19 | 25–19 | 25–22 | | | 75–60 | Report |
| 8 Mar | 16:00 | Harare City (Zimbabwe) | 0–3 | (Cameroon) Bafia VB | 16–25 | 16–25 | 22–25 | | | 54–75 | Report |
| 8 Mar | 18:00 | BDF 6 (Botswana) | 0–3 | (Tunisia) CF de Carthage | 4–25 | 16–25 | 23–25 | | | 43–75 | Report |
| 9 Mar | 13:00 | Bafia VB (Cameroon) | 3–2 | (Botswana) BDF 6 | 26–24 | 11–25 | 21–25 | 25–20 | 15–12 | 98–106 | Report |
| 9 Mar | 19:00 | Nedjmet Riadhi Chlef (Algeria) | 3–0 | (Zimbabwe) Harare City | 25–18 | 25–16 | 25–10 | | | 75–44 | Report |
| 10 Mar | 15:00 | CF de Carthage (Tunisia) | 3–0 | (Cameroon) Bafia VB | 25–13 | 25–16 | 25–15 | | | 75–44 | Report |
| 10 Mar | 18:00 | BDF 6 (Botswana) | 1–3 | (Algeria) Nedjmet Riadhi Chlef | 25–21 | 27–29 | 21–25 | 14–25 | | 87–100 | Report |

=== Pool C ===
| Pos | Team | Pld | W | L | Pts | SW | SL | SR | SPW | SPL | SPR | Qualification |
|---|---|---|---|---|---|---|---|---|---|---|---|---|
| 1 | Kenya Pipeline | 4 | 4 | 0 | 12 | 12 | 1 | 12.000 | 324 | 200 | 1.620 | 1st–8th quarterfinals |
| 2 | (Egypt) El Shams | 4 | 3 | 1 | 9 | 9 | 3 | 3.000 | 291 | 206 | 1.413 | 1st–8th quarterfinals |
| 3 | (Uganda) Vision | 4 | 2 | 2 | 6 | 7 | 6 | 1.167 | 255 | 292 | 0.873 | 9th–16th quarterfinals |
| 4 | (Cameroon) FAP | 4 | 1 | 3 | 3 | 3 | 9 | 0.333 | 227 | 282 | 0.805 | 9th–16th quarterfinals |
| 5 | (Republic of the Congo) DGSP | 4 | 0 | 4 | 0 | 0 | 12 | 0.000 | 184 | 301 | 0.611 | 17th–19th play-offs |

| Date | Time | | Score | | Set 1 | Set 2 | Set 3 | Set 4 | Set 5 | Total | Report |
|---|---|---|---|---|---|---|---|---|---|---|---|
| 6 Mar | 12:00 | Vision (Uganda) | 3–0 | (Republic of the Congo) DGSP | 25–22 | 25–23 | 25–18 | | | 75–63 | Report |
| 6 Mar | 19:00 | El Shams (Egypt) | 0–3 | Kenya Pipeline | 23–25 | 22–25 | 21–25 | | | 66–75 | Report |
| 7 Mar | 14:00 | DGSP (Republic of the Congo) | 0–3 | (Cameroon) FAP | 22–25 | 24–26 | 11–25 | | | 57–76 | Report |
| 7 Mar | 17:00 | El Shams (Egypt) | 3–0 | (Uganda) Vision | 25–12 | 25–12 | 25–20 | | | 75–44 | Report |
| 8 Mar | 14:00 | Vision (Uganda) | 1–3 | Kenya Pipeline | 7–25 | 26–24 | 13–25 | 15–25 | | 61–99 | Report |
| 8 Mar | 17:00 | FAP (Cameroon) | 0–3 | (Egypt) El Shams | 21–25 | 14–25 | 17–25 | | | 52–75 | Report |
| 9 Mar | 15:00 | Vision (Uganda) | 3–0 | (Cameroon) FAP | 25–18 | 25–15 | 25–22 | | | 75–55 | Report |
| 9 Mar | 17:00 | Kenya Pipeline | 3–0 | (Republic of the Congo) DGSP | 25–6 | 25–10 | 25–13 | | | 75–29 | Report |
| 10 Mar | 16:00 | FAP (Cameroon) | 0–3 | Kenya Pipeline | 12–25 | 16–25 | 16–25 | | | 44–75 | Report |
| 10 Mar | 17:00 | DGSP (Republic of the Congo) | 0–3 | (Egypt) El Shams | 9–25 | 9–25 | 17–25 | | | 35–75 | Report |

=== Pool D ===
| Pos | Team | Pld | W | L | Pts | SW | SL | SR | SPW | SPL | SPR | Qualification |
|---|---|---|---|---|---|---|---|---|---|---|---|---|
| 1 | Kenya Prisons | 4 | 4 | 0 | 12 | 12 | 1 | 12.000 | 323 | 175 | 1.846 | 1st–8th quarterfinals |
| 2 | Nigeria Customs | 4 | 3 | 1 | 9 | 9 | 5 | 1.800 | 309 | 270 | 1.144 | 1st–8th quarterfinals |
| 3 | (Cameroon) INJS | 4 | 2 | 2 | 6 | 7 | 6 | 1.167 | 281 | 270 | 1.041 | 9th–16th quarterfinals |
| 4 | (Ivory Coast) ASEC Mimosas | 4 | 1 | 3 | 3 | 3 | 10 | 0.300 | 231 | 314 | 0.736 | 9th–16th quarterfinals |
| 5 | (Burkina Faso) AS Douanes | 4 | 0 | 4 | 0 | 3 | 12 | 0.250 | 250 | 365 | 0.685 | 17th–19th play-offs |

| Date | Time | | Score | | Set 1 | Set 2 | Set 3 | Set 4 | Set 5 | Total | Report |
|---|---|---|---|---|---|---|---|---|---|---|---|
| 6 Mar | 13:00 | Nigeria Customs | 3–1 | (Cameroon) INJS | 23–25 | 25–23 | 25–14 | 25–21 | | 98–83 | Report |
| 6 Mar | 18:00 | ASEC Mimosas (Ivory Coast) | 3–1 | (Burkina Faso) AS Douanes | 25–21 | 21–25 | 25–22 | 25–21 | | 96–89 | Report |
| 7 Mar | 15:00 | INJS (Cameroon) | 3–0 | (Ivory Coast) ASEC Mimosas | 25–21 | 25–21 | 25–12 | | | 75–54 | Report |
| 7 Mar | 18:00 | Kenya Prisons | 3–0 | Nigeria Customs | 25–10 | 25–15 | 25–15 | | | 75–40 | Report |
| 8 Mar | 13:00 | ASEC Mimosas (Ivory Coast) | 0–3 | Kenya Prisons | 7–25 | 17–25 | 12–25 | | | 36–75 | Report |
| 8 Mar | 15:00 | AS Douanes (Burkina Faso) | 0–3 | (Cameroon) INJS | 15–25 | 15–25 | 13–25 | | | 43–75 | Report |
| 9 Mar | 16:00 | Kenya Prisons | 3–1 | (Burkina Faso) AS Douanes | 25–10 | 25–5 | 23–25 | 25–11 | | 98–51 | Report |
| 9 Mar | 18:00 | Nigeria Customs | 3–0 | (Ivory Coast) ASEC Mimosas | 25–15 | 25–15 | 25–15 | | | 75–45 | Report |
| 10 Mar | 12:00 | AS Douanes (Burkina Faso) | 1–3 | Nigeria Customs | 10–25 | 25–21 | 15–25 | 17–25 | | 67–96 | Report |
| 10 Mar | 13:00 | INJS (Cameroon) | 0–3 | Kenya Prisons | 16–25 | 17–25 | 15–25 | | | 48–75 | Report |

== Knockout stage ==
=== 17th to 19th place ===
| 17th–19th play-off | | | 17th place match |
| | | | 1 | (Republic of the Congo) DGSP | 3 |
| 2 | (Republic of the Congo) DGSP | 3 | | (Burkina Faso) AS Douanes | 1 |
| 3 | (Botswana) BDF 6 | 2 |

==== 17th–19th play-off ====
| Date | Time | | Score | | Set 1 | Set 2 | Set 3 | Set 4 | Set 5 | Total | Report |
|---|---|---|---|---|---|---|---|---|---|---|---|
| 12 Mar | 10:00 | DGSP (Republic of the Congo) | 3–2 | (Botswana) BDF 6 | 25–18 | 22–25 | 25–11 | 23–25 | 15–11 | 110–90 | Report |

==== 17th place match ====
| Date | Time | | Score | | Set 1 | Set 2 | Set 3 | Set 4 | Set 5 | Total | Report |
|---|---|---|---|---|---|---|---|---|---|---|---|
| 13 Mar | | DGSP (Republic of the Congo) | 3–1 | (Burkina Faso) AS Douanes | 18–25 | 28–26 | 25–14 | 25–20 | | 96–85 | Report |

=== 9th to 16th place ===
13th place match
(Zimbabwe) Harare City | 0
(Cameroon) Nyong et Kelle | 3
15th place match
(Ivory Coast) ASEC Mimosas | 0
(Cameroon) FAP | 3

13th–16th Semifinals
(Ivory Coast) ASEC Mimosas | 0
(Zimbabwe) Harare City | 3
(Cameroon) Nyong et Kelle | 3
(Cameroon) FAP | 1

9th–16th Quarterfinals
(Uganda) Nkumba | 3
(Ivory Coast) ASEC Mimosas | 0
(Uganda) Vision | 3
(Zimbabwe) Harare City | 1
(Cameroon) INJS | 3
(Cameroon) Nyong et Kelle | 0
(Algeria) Nedjmet Riadhi Chlef | 3
(Cameroon) FAP | 0

9th–12th Semifinals
(Uganda) Nkumba | 3
(Uganda) Vision | 0
(Cameroon) INJS | 3
(Algeria) Nedjmet Riadhi Chlef | 0

9th place match
(Uganda) Nkumba | 3
(Cameroon) INJS | 1
11th place match
(Uganda) Vision | 3
(Algeria) Nedjmet Riadhi Chlef | 2

==== 9th–16th quarter-finals ====
| Date | Time | | Score | | Set 1 | Set 2 | Set 3 | Set 4 | Set 5 | Total | Report |
|---|---|---|---|---|---|---|---|---|---|---|---|
| 12 Mar | 12:00 | Nkumba (Uganda) | 3–0 | (Ivory Coast) ASEC Mimosas | 25–10 | 25–9 | 25–15 | | | 75–34 | Report |
| 12 Mar | 14:00 | INJS (Cameroon) | 3–0 | (Cameroon) Nyong et Kelle | 25–14 | 25–9 | 25–19 | | | 75–42 | Report |
| 12 Mar | 16:00 | Nedjmet Riadhi Chlef (Algeria) | 3–0 | (Cameroon) FAP | 25–17 | 25–22 | 25–22 | | | 75–61 | Report |
| 12 Mar | 18:00 | Vision (Uganda) | 3–1 | (Zimbabwe) Harare City | 25–11 | 25–20 | 17–25 | 25–15 | | 92–71 | Report |

==== 13th–16th semi-finals ====
| Date | Time | | Score | | Set 1 | Set 2 | Set 3 | Set 4 | Set 5 | Total | Report |
|---|---|---|---|---|---|---|---|---|---|---|---|
| 13 Mar | 12:00 | ASEC Mimosas (Ivory Coast) | 0–3 | (Zimbabwe) Harare City | 23–25 | 16–25 | 22–25 | | | 61–75 | Report |
| 13 Mar | 14:00 | Nyong et Kelle (Cameroon) | 3–1 | (Cameroon) FAP | 28–26 | 25–14 | 23–25 | 25–21 | | 101–86 | Report |

==== 9th–12th semi-finals ====
| Date | Time | | Score | | Set 1 | Set 2 | Set 3 | Set 4 | Set 5 | Total | Report |
|---|---|---|---|---|---|---|---|---|---|---|---|
| 13 Mar | 16:00 | Nkumba (Uganda) | 3–0 | (Uganda) Vision | 25–20 | 25–14 | 25–10 | | | 75–44 | Report |
| 13 Mar | 18:00 | INJS (Cameroon) | 3–0 | (Algeria) Nedjmet Riadhi Chlef | 25–17 | 25–22 | 25–14 | | | 75–53 | Report |

==== 15th place match ====
| Date | Time | | Score | | Set 1 | Set 2 | Set 3 | Set 4 | Set 5 | Total | Report |
|---|---|---|---|---|---|---|---|---|---|---|---|
| 14 Mar | 9:00 | ASEC Mimosas (Ivory Coast) | 0–3 | (Cameroon) FAP | 17–25 | 16–25 | 20–25 | | | 53–75 | Report |

==== 13th place match ====
| Date | Time | | Score | | Set 1 | Set 2 | Set 3 | Set 4 | Set 5 | Total | Report |
|---|---|---|---|---|---|---|---|---|---|---|---|
| 14 Mar | 11:00 | Harare City (Zimbabwe) | 0–3 | (Cameroon) Nyong et Kelle | 20–25 | 20–25 | 18–25 | | | 58–75 | Report |

==== 11th place match ====
| Date | Time | | Score | | Set 1 | Set 2 | Set 3 | Set 4 | Set 5 | Total | Report |
|---|---|---|---|---|---|---|---|---|---|---|---|
| 14 Mar | 13:00 | Vision (Uganda) | 3–2 | (Algeria) Nedjmet Riadhi Chlef | 25–23 | 28–26 | 23–25 | 21–25 | 15–12 | 112–111 | Report |

==== 9th place match ====
| Date | Time | | Score | | Set 1 | Set 2 | Set 3 | Set 4 | Set 5 | Total | Report |
|---|---|---|---|---|---|---|---|---|---|---|---|
| 14 Mar | 10:00 | Nkumba (Uganda) | 3–1 | (Cameroon) INJS | 25–11 | 25–19 | 16–25 | 25–18 | | 91–73 | Report |

=== 1st to 8th place ===
Fifth place
(Cameroon) Bafia VB | 0
(Rwanda) Revenue | 3
Seventh place
Nigeria Customs | 0
(Egypt) El Shams | 3

Consolation semifinals
Nigeria Customs | 1
(Cameroon) Bafia VB | 3
(Rwanda) Revenue | 3
(Egypt) El Shams | 1

Quarterfinals
(Egypt) Al Ahly SC | 3
Nigeria Customs | 0
Kenya Pipeline | 3
(Cameroon) Bafia VB | 2
Kenya Prisons | 3
(Rwanda) Revenue | 0
(Tunisia) CF de Carthage | 3
(Egypt) El Shams | 1

Semifinals
(Egypt) Al Ahly SC | 3
Kenya Pipeline | 1
Kenya Prisons | 1
(Tunisia) CF de Carthage | 3

Final
(Egypt) Al Ahly SC | 3
(Tunisia) CF de Carthage | 0
Third place
Kenya Pipeline | 3
Kenya Prisons | 2

==== Quarterfinals ====
| Date | Time | | Score | | Set 1 | Set 2 | Set 3 | Set 4 | Set 5 | Total | Report |
|---|---|---|---|---|---|---|---|---|---|---|---|
| 12 Mar | 13:00 | Kenya Prisons | 3–0 | (Rwanda) Revenue | 25–11 | 25–17 | 26–24 | | | 76–52 | Report |
| 12 Mar | 15:00 | Kenya Pipeline | 3–2 | (Cameroon) Bafia VB | 25–12 | 23–25 | 25–14 | 23–25 | 15–6 | 111–82 | Report |
| 12 Mar | 17:00 | CF de Carthage (Tunisia) | 3–1 | (Egypt) El Sham | 25–8 | 20–25 | 27–25 | 25–23 | | 97–81 | Report |
| 12 Mar | 19:00 | Al Ahly SC (Egypt) | 3–0 | Nigeria Customs | 25–13 | 25–9 | 29–27 | | | 79–49 | Report |

==== 5th–8th semifinals ====
| Date | Time | | Score | | Set 1 | Set 2 | Set 3 | Set 4 | Set 5 | Total | Report |
|---|---|---|---|---|---|---|---|---|---|---|---|
| 13 Mar | 13:00 | Nigeria Customs | 1–3 | (Cameroon) Bafia VB | 21–25 | 25–21 | 23–25 | 22–25 | | 91–96 | Report |
| 13 Mar | 17:00 | Revenue (Rwanda) | 3–1 | (Egypt) El Shams | 25–8 | 20–25 | 27–25 | 25–23 | | 97–81 | Report |

==== 7th place match ====
| Date | Time | | Score | | Set 1 | Set 2 | Set 3 | Set 4 | Set 5 | Total | Report |
|---|---|---|---|---|---|---|---|---|---|---|---|
| 15 Mar | 12:00 | Nigeria Customs | 0–3 | (Egypt) El Sham | 19–25 | 26–28 | 22–25 | | | 67–78 | Report |

==== 5th place match ====
| Date | Time | | Score | | Set 1 | Set 2 | Set 3 | Set 4 | Set 5 | Total | Report |
|---|---|---|---|---|---|---|---|---|---|---|---|
| 15 Mar | 13:00 | Bafia VB (Cameroon) | 0–3 | (Rwanda) Revenue | 21–25 | 19–25 | 14–25 | | | 54–75 | Report |

==== Semifinals ====
| Date | Time | | Score | | Set 1 | Set 2 | Set 3 | Set 4 | Set 5 | Total | Report |
|---|---|---|---|---|---|---|---|---|---|---|---|
| 13 Mar | 15:00 | Kenya Prisons | 1–3 | (Tunisia) CF de Carthage | 15–25 | 25–22 | 23–25 | 21–25 | | 84–97 | Report |
| 13 Mar | 19:00 | Al Ahly SC (Egypt) | 3–1 | Kenya Pipeline | 22–25 | 25–16 | 25–19 | 25–8 | | 97–68 | Report |

==== 3rd place match ====
| Date | Time | | Score | | Set 1 | Set 2 | Set 3 | Set 4 | Set 5 | Total | Report |
|---|---|---|---|---|---|---|---|---|---|---|---|
| 15 Mar | 15:00 | Kenya Pipeline | 3–2 | Kenya Prisons | 23–25 | 25–21 | 25–22 | 27–29 | 15–11 | 115–108 | Report |

==== Final ====
| Date | Time | | Score | | Set 1 | Set 2 | Set 3 | Set 4 | Set 5 | Total | Report |
|---|---|---|---|---|---|---|---|---|---|---|---|
| 15 Mar | 18:00 | Al Ahly SC (Egypt) | 3–0 | (Tunisia) CF de Carthage | 25–9 | 29–27 | 25–8 | | | 79–44 | Report |

== Final standing ==
| Rank | Team |
|---|---|
| 1st place, gold medalist(s) | (Egypt) Al Ahly SC |
| 2nd place, silver medalist(s) | (Tunisia) CF de Carthage |
| 3rd place, bronze medalist(s) | Kenya Pipeline |
| 4 | Kenya Prisons |
| 5 | (Rwanda) Revenue |
| 6 | (Cameroon) Bafia VB |
| 7 | (Egypt) El Shams |
| 8 | Nigeria Customs |
| 9 | (Uganda) Nkumba |
| 10 | (Cameroon) INJS |
| 11 | (Uganda) Vision |
| 12 | (Algeria) Nedjmet Riadhi Chlef |
| 13 | (Cameroon) Nyong et Kelle |
| 14 | (Zimbabwe) Harare City |
| 15 | (Cameroon) FAP |
| 16 | (Ivory Coast) ASEC Mimosas |
| 17 | (Republic of the Congo) DGSP |
| 18 | (Burkina Faso) AS Douanes |
| 19 | (Botswana) BDF 6 |

Source: CAVB.

=== Awards ===
- MVP: (Egypt) Aya Elshamy (Al Ahly SC)
- Best blocker: Trizah Atouka (Kenya Pipeline)
- Best libero: (Egypt) Mariam Moustafa (Al Ahly SC)
- Best receiver: Elizabeth Wanyama Nafula (Kenya Prisons)
- Best server: (Egypt) Farida Elaskalany (Al Ahly SC)
- Best setter: (Tunisia) Amina Mansour (CF de Carthage)
- Best spiker: (Tunisia) Khloud Genhani (CF de Carthage)

Source: CAVB.
