= Tunisian Women's Volleyball Cup =

- Current season, competition or edition: 2022–23 Tunisian Women's Volleyball Cup
- Sport: Volleyball
- Founded: 1959; 67 years ago
- No. of teams: 16 (in 2023)
- Country: Tunisia
- Continent: Africa (CAVB)
- Most recent champions: CF Carthage (2023)
- Most titles: Al Hilal Sports (14 titles)
- Level on pyramid: 1
- Related competitions: African Cup Winners
- Website: ftvb.org

The Tunisian Women's Volleyball Cup is a women's volleyball competition in Tunisia held every year since its inception in 1959 and it is organized by The Tunisian Volleyball Federation. The competition winners used to compete in African Cup Winners but this African competition does not exist anymore, having ended in 2006.

== List of champions ==
- 1959 : Club Africain
- 1960 : Unknown winners
- 1961 : Alliance Sportive
- 1962 : Alliance Sportive
- 1963 : Alliance Sportive
- 1964 : Club Sportif des Cheminots
- 1965 : Club Sportif des Cheminots
- 1966 : Al Hilal Sports
- 1967 : Al Hilal Sports
- 1968 : Al Hilal Sports
- 1969 : Espérance du Tunis
- 1970 : Jeunesse sportive d'El Omrane
- 1971 : Jeunesse sportive d'El Omrane
- 1972 : Jeunesse sportive d'El Omrane
- 1973 : Jeunesse sportive d'El Omrane
- 1974 : AS Marsa V.C.
- 1975 : Espérance de Tunis
- 1976 : AS Marsa V.C.
- 1977 : AS Marsa V.C.
- 1978 : AS Marsa V.C.
- 1979 : AS Marsa V.C.
- 1980 : AS Marsa V.C.
- 1981 : AS Marsa V.C.
- 1982 : AS Marsa V.C.
- 1983 : Club Africain
- 1984 : Club Africain
- 1985 : Club Africain
- 1986 : Al Hilal Sports
- 1987 : Club Africain
- 1988 : Club Africain
- 1989 : Club Africain
- 1990 : Club Africain
- 1991 : Club Africain
- 1992 : Al Hilal Sports
- 1993 : Al Hilal Sports
- 1994 : Al Hilal Sports
- 1995 : Al Hilal Sports
- 1996 : Al Hilal Sports
- 1997 : Ariana University
- 1998 : Al Hilal Sports
- 1999 : Al Hilal Sports
- 2000 : CS Sfaxien
- 2001 : Al Hilal Sports
- 2002 : Al Hilal Sports
- 2003 : CO Kélibia
- 2004 : CO Kélibia
- 2005 : CS Sfaxien
- 2006 : CO Kélibia
- 2007 : Al Hilal Sports
- 2008 : CS Sfaxien
- 2009 : CS Sfaxien
- 2010 : US Carthage
- 2011 : US Carthage
- 2012 : CS Sfaxien
- 2013 : CS Sfaxien
- 2014 : CS Sfaxien
- 2015 : CF Carthage
- 2016 : CF Carthage
- 2017 : CF Carthage
- 2018 : CS Sfaxien
- 2019 : CS Sfaxien
- 2020 : CF Carthage
- 2021 : CF Carthage
- 2022 : CF Carthage
- 2023 : CF Carthage
- 2024 : CS Sfaxien

== Titles by club ==
Rk	Club	Cups	Season
1	Al Hilal Sports	14	1966, 1967, 1968, 1986, 1992, 1993, 1994, 1995, 1996, 1998, 1999, 2001, 2002, 2007
2	CS Sfaxien	10	2000, 2005, 2008, 2009, 2012, 2013, 2014, 2018, 2019, 2024
3	Club Africain	9	1959, 1983, 1984, 1985, 1987, 1988, 1989, 1990, 1991
4	CF Carthage	8	2015, 2016, 2017, 2020, 2021, 2022, 2023, 2025
=	AS Marsa V.C.	8	1974, 1976, 1977, 1978, 1979, 1980, 1981, 1982
6	JS Omrane	4	1970, 1971, 1972, 1973
7	CO Kélibia	3	2003, 2004, 2006
=	Alliance Sportive	3	1961, 1962, 1963
9	US Carthage	2	2010, 2011
=	Espérance de Tunis	2	1969, 1975
=	CS Cheminots	2	1964, 1965
12	Ariana University	1	1997

== See also ==
- Tunisian Volleyball Cup
