= AS Marsa (women's volleyball) =

Tunisian volleyball club

AS Marsa WVB
- Full name: Avenir sportif de La Marsa
- Short name: ASM
- Nickname: El Gnawia
- Founded: 1944
- Ground: Salle Marsa, La Marsa, Tunis (Capacity: 1,000)
- League: Tunisian Volleyball League
- 2016–17: 6th Place
- Website: Club home page

Uniforms
Home	Away

Avenir sportif de La Marsa Women's Volleyball Club (Arabic: نادي المستقبل الرياضي بالمرسي للكرة الطائرة النسائية, English: El Marsa Future Association Club or ASM) is a Tunisian women's Volleyball team based in La Marsa, Tunis Town. It is part of AS Marsa Women's main section since 1944 and currently playing in the Tunisian Women's Volleyball League Top Division. The club won the Tunisian Championship for 6 consecutive years from 1974 to 1979 and the Tunisian Volleyball Cup Crown 7 consecutive times (8 total).

== Honours ==
=== National titles ===
- Tunisian Volleyball League 6 :

Champions : 1973–74, 1974–75, 1975–76, 1976–77, 1977–78, 1978–79
Vice Champion :

- Tunisian Volleyball Cup 8 :

Champions : 1973–74, 1975–76, 1976–77, 1977–78, 1978–79, 1979–80, 1980–81, 1981–82
Runners Up : 1971–72, 1974–75

== Current squad 2017–18 ==
AS Marsa Volleyball roster
Players List: 01 (Tunisia); 02 (Tunisia); 03 (Tunisia); 04 (Tunisia); 05 (Tunisia); 06 (Tunisia); 07 (Tunisia); 08 (Tunisia); 09 (Tunisia); 10 (Tunisia); 11 (Tunisia); 12 (Tunisia)	Technical staff: Head coach : (Tunisia); Assistant coach : (Tunisia); Club doctor : (Tunisia)

== See also ==
- AS Marsa
- AS Marsa (volleyball)
