= Kenya Posts and Telecommunications Corporation =

Agency overview
- Formed: 1977
- Dissolved: 1999
- Superseding agency: Telkom Kenya, Postal Corporation of Kenya, Communications Commission of Kenya
- Jurisdiction: Government of Kenya
- Headquarters: Nairobi, Kenya
- Parent department: Ministry of Transport and Communications

Kenya Posts and Telecommunications Corporation (KPTC) was a government company that provided telecommunication and postal services across Kenya. In 1999, the KPTC was separated into three separate entities - Telkom Kenya, Kenya Postal Corporation and the Communication Commission of Kenya,(CCK) the licensing and regulatory authority of the government.

== History ==
From 1948 to 1977, postal service in Kenya, Tanzania and Uganda was provided by the East African Posts and Telecommunications Corporation. The dissolution of the first East African Community since that era forced Kenya to establish its own monopoly communications company, KPTC.

New government economic policies in the mid 1990s were developed and adopted, supported by the International Monetary Fund (IMF) and World Bank. Recommendations of that process included separation of the postal and telecommunication operations. An IMF loan arrangement also depended on privatisation of KPTC, but IMF suspended this in July 1997 over reported concerns of government corruption.

Controversy over IMF telecommunications privatisation policies continued. KPTC's Board of Directors was terminated by the Kenyan government in February 1999 prior to an IMF visit to the country.

In 1999, the corporation was broken up into three entities:

1. Telkom Kenya providing telecommunications services,
2. Postal Corporation of Kenya to offer postal services,
3. Communications Commission of Kenya (CCK), a separate national regulatory authority.

== Service provision and quality ==
Telephone service quality in Kenya remained problematic at times. Official waiting lists of customers seeking telephone service increased almost fourfold to almost 79 000 between 1977 and 1983, but had been reduced to less than 50 000 by 1986. These waiting lists only applied to areas where telephone service is available.

In 2003, years after the division of KPTC, CCK Board Chairman Peter Kariuki noted the total number of people remaining to be connected to telephone service in Kenya stood at 7 million. Emerging private mobile telephone companies provide service capacity, but remained too expensive for many citizens.
