= Club Africain (women's volleyball) =

Tunisian volleyball club

Club Africain Volleyball
- Full name: Club Africain
- Short name: CA, Al Ifriqi
- Nickname: El Ghalia, El hamra
- Founded: 1958
- Ground: Salle Chérif-Bellamine, Tunis (Capacity: 1,500)
- League: Tunisian Volleyball Division
- Website: Club home page

Uniforms
Home	Away

Club Africain Women's Volleyball Club (Arabic: النادي الافريقي للكرة الطائرة للسيدات, English: African Club or CA) is a Tunisian women's volleyball club based in Tunis. It was formed in 1958 and is one of women's main section of Club Africain that currently plays in Tunisian Volleyball League Division A after this discipline was revived again in 2012.

== History ==
Club Africain’s women’s Volleyball team was Founded in 1958, the team won both the league title and the Tunisian Cup in its inaugural year, thanks to the efforts of its pioneering players, including Faïza and Jalila Hentati, Edith Serfati, Samia Zaouch, Saïda Ben Ahmed, and Geneviève Tremsal.

Two years later, the team was disbanded. It resumed its activities in 1970 and received considerable support, enabling it to win eleven league titles, eight Tunisian Cups, and four African Cups. This successful period was marked by the contributions of players such as Jawa Ben Zaara, Sonia Ben Zineb, Samia Ben Amara, Azza Fridhi, Raoudha Laouani, Raja Bouberna, and Jalila Bouberna.

Despite these achievements, the team was disbanded once again in 1996, even though it had finished second in the league and reached the Tunisian Cup final that same year. but in 2012 The new management took steps to bring the team back and restore its place in the Tunisian women's volleyball system back again. however the club return to the Tunisian Women's Volleyball League (National A) since 2018 after winning the National B league in 2017.

== Honours ==
=== National titles ===
- Tunisian Volleyball League 13 :

Champions : 1958–59, 1979–80, 1980–81, 1981–82, 1982–83, 1983–84, 1984–85, 1985–86, 1986–87, 1989–90, 1990–91, 1992–93, 1993–94

- Tunisian Volleyball Cup 09 :

Champions : 1958–59, 1982–83, 1983–84, 1984–85, 1986–87, 1987–88, 1988–89, 1989–90, 1990–91

=== International titles ===
- African Champions Cup 4 :

Champions : 1986, 1987, 1988, 1989

- African Cup Winners' Cup 1 :

Champions : 1992

== Current squad 2025/26 ==
No.	Name	Nationality	Position	Height (cm)	Birth Year
10	Amina Mansour	Tunisia	Setter	171	1989
5	Maya Lahmar	Tunisia	Opposite	184	2008
—	Wissem Djouhri	Algeria	Opposite	180	2002
2	Rahma Khedri	Tunisia	Outside Hitter	179	2002
4	Ons Jenhani	Tunisia	Outside Hitter	178	1994
7	Rahma Agrebi	Tunisia	Outside Hitter	176	1990
9	Emna Khalfa	Tunisia	Outside Hitter	173	1996
11	Fatma Chikhaoui	Tunisia	Outside Hitter	175	2007
15	Tasnim Souiden	Tunisia	Outside Hitter	175	2002
17	Soumaya Kaabar	Tunisia	Outside Hitter	170	2005
19	Sirine Hmem	Tunisia	Outside Hitter	—	—
8	Abir Othmani	Tunisia	Middle-blocker	180	1991
12	Yosrah Zeramdini	Tunisia	Middle-blocker	184	—
14	Missaoui Rim	Tunisia	Middle-blocker	180	1994
16	Khadija Badarjah	Tunisia	Middle-blocker	181	1997
1	Samar Saafi	Tunisia	Libero	169	1998
18	Sondos Sassi	Tunisia	Libero	—	—
3	Emna Ayed	Tunisia	Universal	170	1998

== See also ==
- Club Africain (football)
- Club Africain (basketball)
- Club Africain (handball)
- Club Africain (men's volleyball)
