= Communications Authority of Kenya =

Communications agency in Kenya

Communications Authority of Kenya (CA)
Agency overview
- Formed: 1999
- Jurisdiction: Government of Kenya
- Headquarters: CA Centre Nairobi Regional Offices : Nairobi I Mombasa I Kisumu I Nyeri
- Minister responsible: Hon. William Kabogo, Cabinet Secretary, Ministry of Information, Communications and the Digital Economy., Prof. Edward Kisiang'ani, CBS, Principal Secretary, State Department for Broadcasting and Telecommunications
- Agency executives: Mary Mungai, CBS, Chairperson, Board of Directors; David Mugonyi, EBS, Director General
- Parent agency: Ministry of Information, Communications and the Digital Economy (https://ict.go.ke/)
- Website: https://ca.go.ke/

The Communications Authority of Kenya (CA) is the independent regulatory agency for the ICT (Information, Communications and Technology) industry in Kenya with responsibilities in telecommunications, e-commerce, broadcasting, cyber security, and postal/courier services. The CA is also responsible for managing the country's numbering and frequency spectrum resources, administering the Universal Service Fund (USF) as well as safeguarding the interests of users of ICT services.

The Authority began its operations on 1 July 1999 as the Communications Commission of Kenya (CCK) after the split of the Kenya Posts and Telecommunications Corporation (KPTC), following the enactment of the Kenya Information and Communications Act (KICA), 1998.

Since its establishment, the Authority has executed its mandate through implementation of five Strategic Plans, which are aligned with the national priorities, regional and international development frameworks.

The Authority’s current 5th Strategic Plan 2023-2027 is aligned with the Bottom Economic Transformation Agenda (BETA); 4th Medium Term Plan 2023-2027; Kenya National Digital Master Plan 2022-2023; Kenya Vision 2030; East African Community (EAC) Vision 20250; Agenda 2063 – The Africa We Want; and the 2030 Agenda for Sustainable Development.

== Mandate ==
The Communications Authority of Kenya's responsibility entails:

- Licensing all systems and services in the communications industry, including; telecommunications, postal, courier and broadcasting.
- Managing the country’s frequency spectrum and numbering resources.
- Facilitating the development of e-commerce.
- Type approving and accepting communications equipment meant for use in the country.
- Protecting consumer rights within the communications environment.
- Managing competition within the sector to ensure a level playing ground for all players.
- Regulating retail and wholesale tariffs for communications services.
- Managing the universal access fund to facilitate access to communications services by all in Kenya.
- Monitoring the activities of licensees to enforce compliance with the license terms and conditions as well as the law.

Below are some of the relevant sector regulations:

- Kenya Information and Communications Act, 1998
- Kenya Information and Communications (Fair Competition and Equality of Treatment) Regulations, 2010
- Kenya Information and Communication (Dispute Resolution) Regulations, 2010
- Kenya Information and Communications (Interconnection and Provision of Fixed Links, Access and Facilities) Regulations, 2010
- Kenya Information and Communication (Tariff) Regulations, 2010
- The Kenya Communications (Broadcasting) Regulations, 2009
- The Kenya Communications Regulations, 2001

== History ==
Kenya gained independence from the United Kingdom in 1963, an event which transformed the colonial laws and policy development towards telecommunications, broadcasting and the media.

In 1997, the first policy guideline specific to telecommunications and postal sector liberalisation was issued based on the Economic Recovery Strategy for Wealth and Employment Creation (2003–2007). This policy guideline was developed by the Kenya Posts and Telecommunication Corporation (KP&TC) and the Ministry of Transport and Communications. It set out the role of the sector in national development, stated the policy objectives and identified targets as well as strategies to be pursued. The desired market structure for liberalisation was also articulated in the policy. This policy guideline led to the transformation of the telecommunications and postal sector, the creation of the Kenya Communications Act (KCA, 1998) and the Postal Corporation Act (1998).

Prior to 1998, the KP&TC was the sole provider of basic telecommunications services. Telkom Kenya was created in 1999 as a separate legal entity from the previous postal and telecommunications statutory body and is slated for privatisation.

The proliferation of mass media, economic demands and pressure from donors as well as civil society forced the government to review the laws governing the media with a view to liberalising the airwaves, abolishing of restrictive media laws, and harmonization of Kenya Post and Telecommunication Act and Kenya Broadcasting Acts. (Mureithi, 2002)

Initially the government split KP&TC into two entities through the Kenya Communication Bill (1997) and the Postal Corporation Bill (April 1997). However the Kenyan government created the telecommunication regulator at the same time that the telecommunications and postal arms of the PTT ministry were spun off as separate operating entities through the Kenya Communications Act of 1998. This move led to the dismantling of KP&TC into the Communications Commission of Kenya, Telkom Kenya Limited and Postal Corporation of Kenya as well as the formation of to serve as the policy advisory arm of the Government on all matters pertaining to the ICT, National Communications Secretariat was also formed.

In 2000, the Ministry of Information, Transport and Communications prepared a cabinet paper on broadcasting with the status of a sector policy statement. Following that, in 2001 the ministry prepared a draft broadcasting bill and broadcasting policy, however the 2 documents never got approved by parliament.

In 2004 the Ministry of Information and Communications published the draft national ICT policy. It was adopted in 2006 and it aimed at creating an enabled and knowledge-based society by using ICTs to improve the livelihoods of Kenyans.

The liberalisation of the communications sector has had a positive effect on the deployment of communications infrastructure and services in the country. However, the opening up of the sector has not availed communications services to all in Kenya as the licensed commercial operators and service providers have tended to concentrate operations in areas where a return on investment is guaranteed.

The Kenya Information and Communications (Amendment) Act, 2009, established the Universal Service Fund (USF), now administered and managed by the Communications Authority of Kenya (CA). The purpose of the Fund is to support widespread access to ICT services, and promote capacity building and innovation in ICT services in the country.

The sources of the Fund include levies on licensees, appropriations from Government as well as grants and donations. The Fund is expected to finance national projects that have a significant impact on the availability and accessibility of ICTs in rural, remote, and poor urban areas.

In 2010, Kenya ushered in a new dispensation with the promulgation of the new Constitution. To ensure the ICT sector was aligned with the new constitution, the Kenya Information and Communications (Amendment) Act was passed in 2013, leading to the renaming of the Communications Commission of Kenya to the Communications Authority of Kenya (CA). This change also came with the additional mandate of managing the country's cyber security. Subsequently, the Kenya National Computer Incident Response Team (National KE-CIRT) was established as a trusted point of contact for all matters regarding cyber security and collaborating with other players global to mitigate cyber threats.

In 2015, the Authority oversaw the transition from analog to digital television broadcasting, making Kenya among the first countries in Africa to meet the global deadline of 17 June 2015. The initiative, though riddled with a series of litigation, opened up the world of broadcasting, providing consumers with diverse, local content and investors the space to invest in the broadcasting industry.

The Authority has also overseen other groundbreaking initiatives such as the licensing of Mobile Virtual Network Operators (MVNOs) in the Kenyan market and the operationalisation of the Universal Service Fund, which is availing communications services to remote and hard-to-reach parts of the country. As of 2023, about 750,000 Kenyans had been connected to mobile network connectivity through construction of 108 towers across 127 sub-locations. About 117 others are being connected. A 2021 ICT Access Gap study showed that about 3.6% of Kenyans were not connected, translating to a population of about 1.7 million people. Others initiatives include a licensing and shared spectrum framework for Community Networks in Kenya.

In 2019, the CA marked its 20 years of existence, during which tremendous strides have been achieved in the sector.

In 2020, a new National ICT Policy was adopted, with an ambitious focus on embracing the digital economy, e-commerce and other new frontiers in cutting-edge technology. As of 2021, Kenya was undertaking 5G trials, beginning a new journey to exponential future ICT growth.

In April 2022, the Government launched a ten-year Digital Masterplan to chart the country's digital course towards growth and innovation. The National Digital Masterplan 2022 – 2032 is the foundation of the country's digital transformation in the next decade, catalyzing the adoption of digital skills and guiding ICT developments and investments for local and external investors.

The 2022 Government Digital Transformation Agenda (GoDTA) seeks to realize the Digital Superhighway by enhancing universal broadband by laying out 100,000 km of fibre optic cable, digitising at least 80% of government services; setting up 25,000 public wifi hotspots; development of eight regional ICT hubs and centres of excellence, enhancement of data protection and cyber security management and catalysing the creative economy, amongst others.

== Structure and functions ==
=== Board of directors ===
This is a list of the current board of directors as of December 2024 :

• Ms. Mary Mungai, CBS-Chairperson of the Board.

• Mr.David Mugonyi, MBS-Director-General

• Dr. Raymond Omolo, CBS, Principal Secretary, Internal Security and National Administration

• Dr. Chris Kiptoo, CBS, Principal Secretary, National Treasury

• Prof. Edward Kisiang'ani, CBS, Principal Secretary, Broadcasting and Telecommunications

• Mr. Joel Okeng'o Nyambane

• Dr. Jane Musangi Mutua

• Hon. Daniel Kipkogei Rono

• Ms. Christine Bhoke Nchamah

• Mr. Paul Mureithi

• Mr. Erick Langat

• Ms. Ummu Bunu Haji Ahmad

• Mr. Waweru Kimani, alternate to Principal Secretary, Broadcasting and Telecommunications

• Mr. Henry Mutwiri Riungu, alternate to Principal Secretary, The National Treasury & Planning

• Mr. Frederick Muhul, alternate to Principal Secretary, Ministry of Interior & National Administration

ORGANIZATION STRUCTURE

The Authority is broadly structured into three directorates, namely, Technical Operations and Compliance, Market and Consumer Affairs, and Corporate Services and Administration.

The directorates are headed by Senior Directors who report to the Director General. Under them are 21 departments headed by Directors:

Technical Operations and Compliance Directorate Departments:

i). Frequency Spectrum Management ii). Multimedia Services iii). Postal & Telecom Services iv). Cyber Security v). Compliance & Enforcement vi). Monitoring, Inspection & Regional Coordination

Market and Consumer Affairs Directorate Departments:

i). Competition Management ii). Consumer Protection & Advocacy iii). Public Education & Awareness iv). Standards & Type Approval v). Regulatory Affairs

Corporate Services and Administration Directorate Departments:

i). Finance & Accounts ii). Human Resource & Administration iii). Information, Communications & Technology iv). Corporate Communications

The following departments report directly to the Director General:

i). Universal Service Fund ii). Corporation Secretary & Legal Services iii). Research, Planning & Quality Management iv). Supply Chain Management v). Internal Audit & Risk Assurance

REGIONAL OFFICES

The Authority has established four regional offices in line with the Constitutional requirement of devolution of public services and in order to conveniently serve its customers in various parts of the country.

1. Nairobi Regional Office- Based at CA, Centre, Waiyaki Way, Westlands

2. Nyanza Regional Office- Based at Lake Basin Mall, Kisumu.

3. Western Regional Office- Based at the KVDA Plaza, Eldoret.

4. Central and Eastern Regional Office-Based at the Advocates Plaza, Nyeri.

5. Coast Regional Office-Based at the NSSF Building, Mombasa.

https://ca.go.ke/

== International affiliations ==
The Authority is Kenya's designated representative to local, regional and international ICT fora. The Authority coordinates country positions at these fora and also implements international agreements on ICTs locally.

Affiliated International Bodies

- International Telecommunication Union (ITU)
- African Telecommunications Union (ATU)
- Universal Postal Union (UPU)
- Pan African Postal Union (PAPU)
- East African Communications Organization (EACO)
- Commonwealth Telecommunications Organization (CTO)
- Association of Regulators of Information and Communication in Eastern Africa (ARICEA)
- African Advanced Level Telecommunications Institute (AFRALTI)

== See also ==
- List of telecommunications regulatory bodies
