= Women's African Cup Winners' Cup (volleyball) =

Volleyball competition

Women's African Volleyball Cup Winners
- Sport: Volleyball
- Founded: 1989
- Folded: Unknown
- Country: CAVB members
- Continent: Africa
- Last champion: (Egypt) Al Ahly SC (8th title)
- Most titles: (Egypt) Al Ahly SC (8 titles)

The Women's African Volleyball Clubs Cup Winners was a competition for volleyball clubs in Africa organised by the African Volleyball Confederation Gather the African teams that have won their national Cups In a tournament held since 1989 but dissolved later.

== Results ==
Year	Host	Final			Third place match		
Year	Host	Champion	Score	Runner-up	Third place	Score	Fourth place
1989	(Egypt); Cairo	(Egypt); Al Ahly SC	3-1	(Egypt); Zamalek SC	(Ethiopia); Ethiopian Coffee	–	(Zambia); Barclays
1990	(Egypt); Cairo	(Egypt); Al Ahly SC	–	(Cameroon); AES Sonel	(Algeria); ASW Béjaïa	–	(Egypt); Zamalek SC
1991	(Algeria); Blida	(Egypt); Al Ahly SC	3-1	(Cameroon); AES Sonel	(Algeria); MC Alger	–	(Cameroon); Fap Yaoundé
1992	(Egypt); Cairo	(Algeria); MC Alger	3-1	(Egypt); Al Ahly SC	(Cameroon); AES Sonel	–	(Algeria); ASW Béjaïa
1993	Gaborone	(Egypt); Al Ahly SC	3-1	(Kenya); Commercial Bank	(Algeria); ASW Béjaïa	–	(Algeria); MC Alger
1994	(Tunisia); Tunis	(Tunisia); CS Hilalien		[[]]	[[]]	–	[[]]
1995	Cairo	(Egypt); Al Ahly SC	3-0	(Algeria); ASW Béjaïa	[[]]	–	[[]]
1996	[[]]	(Egypt); Al Ahly SC		[[]]	[[]]	–	[[]]
1997	Cairo	Telkom Kenya		(Egypt); Al Ahly SC	[[]]	–	[[]]
1998	Cairo	(Egypt); Al Ahly SC	3-0	Telkom Kenya	Kenya Pipelines	–	(Tunisia); Université de l'Ariana
1999	Nairobi	(Egypt); Al Ahly SC	3-2	Telkom Kenya	[[]]	–	[[]]
2000	[[]]	[[]]		[[]]	[[]]	–	[[]]
2001	(Kenya); Nairobi	Telkom Kenya		(Cameroon); SONEL Yaoundé	[[]]	–	[[]]
2002	(Algeria); Alger	(Algeria); MC Alger		Telkom Kenya	[[]]	–	[[]]
2003	[[]]	[[]]		[[]]	[[]]	–	[[]]
2004	[[]]	[[]]		[[]]	[[]]	–	[[]]
2005	[[]]	[[]]		[[]]	[[]]	–	[[]]
2006	[[]]	[[]]		[[]]	[[]]	–	[[]]

== Winners by club ==
Rank	Club	Winners	Runners-up	Third place	Total
1	(Egypt) Al Ahly SC	8	2		10
2	Telkom Kenya	2	2		4
3	(Algeria) MC Alger	2			2
Total		12	4		16

== Winners by country ==
Rank	Country	Winners	Runners-up	Third place	Total
1	Egypt	8	3		11
2	Kenya	2	2	1	5
4	Algeria	2	1	3	6
3	Tunisia	1			1
Total		13	6	4	23
