= Jambonet =

Jambonet is a Kenyan internet service provider. Until June 30, 2004, it operated as the sole carrier of international internet traffic to and from Kenya. Its monopoly partially ended on that date under terms of which the government of Kenya began licensing other companies to compete in the field of internet telephony. Jambonet currently uses four VSAT satellites to carry the country's internet traffic.

Jambonet is a subsidiary of Telkom Kenya.

== See also ==
- Kenya Internet Exchange
