= Women's African Volleyball Club Championship =

International women's club volleyball competition

Women's African Volleyball Clubs Championship
- Most recent season or competition: 2026 Women's African Volleyball Clubs Championship
- Sport: Volleyball
- Founded: 1986
- No. of teams: 18 (2026)
- Country: CAVB members
- Continent: Africa
- Most recent champion: (Egypt) Al Ahly SC (2026)
- Most titles: (Egypt) Al Ahly SC (11 titles)
- Website: cavb.africa

The Women's African Volleyball Clubs Championship is an international women's club volleyball competition organized by the African Volleyball Confederation. It is Africa's most important continental women's club volleyball competition and was first contested in 1986. It was not held for a few years during the 1990s, but tournaments have been held yearly since 1997.

Winners of the competition qualified as continental champions for the FIVB Volleyball Women's Club World Championship between 2010 and 2014. Starting from 2024 the winner is once again qualified for the Club World Championship.

== Results ==
Year	Host	Final			Third place match			Teams
Year	Host	Champions	Score	Runners-up	Third place	Score	Fourth place	Teams
1986; Details	(Tunisia); Tunis	(Tunisia); Club Africain	3 – 0	(Morocco); FAR Rabat	(Egypt); Al Ahly SC	–	(Algeria); MP Alger	
1987; Details	(Egypt); Cairo	(Tunisia); Club Africain	–	(Egypt); Al Ahly SC	(Algeria); MP Alger	–	(Egypt); Heliopolis Sporting Club	
1988; Details	(Algeria); Algiers	(Tunisia); Club Africain	–	(Egypt); Al Ahly SC	(Algeria); MP Alger	–	(Tunisia); Zitouna Sports	
1989; Details	(Tunisia); Tunis	(Tunisia); Club Africain	3 – 2	(Egypt); Al Ahly SC	(Tunisia); Al Hilal	3 – 2	(Algeria); MC Alger	
1990; Details		(Egypt) Al Ahly SC						
1991; Details	(Kenya); Nairobi	Posta Kenya	–	(Egypt); Al Ahly SC	(Algeria); MC Alger	–		
1992; Details		Posta Kenya	–			–		
1993	Not Held							
1994	Not Held							
1995	Not Held							
1996	Not Held							
1997; Details	(Algeria); Béjaïa	(Algeria); ASW Béjaïa	–	(Egypt); Al Ahly SC		–	(Algeria); MC Alger	
1998; Details	(Kenya); Nairobi	Kenya Pipelines	–	(Egypt); Al Ahly SC	(Kenya); Commercial Bank	–		
1999; Details		(Egypt); Al Ahly SC	–	Kenya Pipelines		–		
2000; Details	(Egypt)	(Egypt); Al Ahly SC	–	Kenya Pipelines		–		
2001; Details	(Algeria); Tlemcen	Kenya Pipelines	Round-robin	(Egypt); Al Ahly SC	Telkom Kenya	Round-robin	(Cameroon); AES Sonel	
2002; Details	(Senegal); Dakar	Kenya Pipelines	Round-robin	(Algeria); MC Alger	(Seychelles); Cascade	Round-robin	(Senegal); Sococim VBC	
2003; Details	(Egypt); Cairo	(Egypt); Al Ahly SC	Round-robin	Kenya Pipelines	(Cameroon); AES Sonel	Round-robin	(Cameroon); INJS Volley	
2004; Details	(Senegal); Dakar	Kenya Pipelines	3 – 0	(Algeria); NC de Béjaïa	(Egypt); Al Ahly SC	3 – 0	(Republic of the Congo); Inter Club Brazzaville	
2005; Details	(Kenya); Nairobi	Kenya Pipelines	3 – 0	(Egypt); Al Ahly SC	(Kenya); Commercial Bank	3 – 0	Telkom Kenya	
2006; Details	(Mauritius); Vacoas	(Kenya); Commercial Bank	3 – 2	(Egypt); Al Ahly SC	Kenya Pipelines	3 – 0	(Botswana); Mafolofolo VBC	
2007; Details	(Egypt); Cairo	(Egypt); Al Ahly SC	3 – 1	Kenya Pipelines	(Kenya); Commercial Bank	3 – 0	(Egypt); El Shams Club	
2008; Details	(Egypt); Cairo	Kenya Prisons	3 – 0	(Algeria); MC Alger	(Kenya); Commercial Bank	3 – 1	(Egypt); Al Ahly SC	
2009; Details	(Kenya); Nairobi	(Egypt); Al Ahly SC	3 – 1	(Kenya); Commercial Bank	(Algeria); NC de Béjaïa	3 – 1	(Cameroon); INJS Volley	
2010; Details	(Mauritius); Vacoas	Kenya Prisons	3 – 1	Kenya Pipelines	(Kenya); Commercial Bank	3 – 1	(Cameroon); Bafia Evolution	15
2011; Details	(Kenya); Nairobi	Kenya Prisons	3 – 0	Kenya Pipelines	(Egypt); Al Ahly SC	3 – 1	(Cameroon); INJS Volley	15
2012; Details	(Kenya); Nairobi	Kenya Prisons	3 – 0	Kenya Pipelines	(Algeria); NJ de Chlef	3 – 0	(Cameroon); FAP Yaoundé	18
2013; Details	(Madagascar); Antananarivo	Kenya Prisons	3 – 2	(Algeria); GSP Alger	(Egypt); Al Ahly SC	3 – 0	(Algeria); MB Béjaïa	15
2014; Details	(Tunisia); Tunis	(Algeria); GSP Alger	3 – 0	Kenya Prisons	Kenya Pipelines	3 – 1	(Tunisia); CF de Carthage	16
2015; Details	(Egypt); Cairo	(Egypt); Al Ahly SC	3 – 1	Kenya Pipelines	(Tunisia); CF de Carthage	3 – 2	(Egypt); El Shams	13
2016; Details	(Tunisia); Carthage	(Egypt); Al Ahly SC	3 – 2	(Tunisia); CF de Carthage	Kenya Pipelines	3 – 1	(Rwanda); Revenue Club	17
2017; Details	(Tunisia); Monastir	(Tunisia); CF de Carthage	3 – 2	(Egypt); El Shams	Kenya Prisons	3 – 2	(Egypt); Al Ahly SC	17
2018; Details	(Egypt); Cairo	(Egypt); Al Ahly SC	3 – 0	(Tunisia); CF de Carthage	Kenya Pipelines	3 – 2	Kenya Prisons	19
2019; Details	(Egypt); Cairo	(Egypt); Al Ahly SC	3 – 1	(Tunisia); CF de Carthage	Kenya Pipelines	3 – 0	(Algeria); GSP Alger	17
2020	Canceled due to COVID-19 pandemic							
2021; Details	(Tunisia); Kelibia	(Tunisia); CF de Carthage	3 – 0	(Tunisia); CS Sfaxien	Kenya Prisons	3 – 0	Nigeria Customs	11
2022; Details	(Tunisia); Kelibia; El Haouaria	(Kenya); Commercial Bank	3 – 1	(Egypt); Al Ahly SC	Kenya Pipelines	3 – 2	(Tunisia); CF de Carthage	16
2023; Details	(Tunisia); Nabeul; Grombalia	(Egypt); Zamalek SC	3 – 1	Kenya Pipelines	(Tunisia); CF de Carthage	3 – 0	(Algeria); GS Pétroliers	16
2024; Details	(Egypt); Cairo	(Egypt); Zamalek SC	3 – 2	(Egypt); Al Ahly SC	Kenya Pipelines	3 – 1	(Kenya); Commercial Bank	15
2025; Details	(Nigeria); Abuja	(Egypt); Zamalek SC	3 – 1	(Egypt); Al Ahly SC	Kenya Pipelines	3 – 0	(Tunisia); CF de Carthage	16
2026; Details	(Egypt); Cairo	(Egypt); Al Ahly SC	3 – 1	(Kenya); Commercial Bank	Kenya Pipelines	3 – 1	(Tunisia); CF de Carthage	18

Source: CAVB

== Wins by club ==
Rank	Club	Winners	Runners-up	Third Place	Total
1	(Egypt) Al Ahly SC	11	12	4	27
2	Kenya Pipelines	5	9	9	23
3	Kenya Prisons	5	1	2	8
4	(Tunisia) Club Africain	4			4
5	(Egypt) Zamalek SC	3			3
6	(Tunisia) CF de Carthage	2	3	2	7
7	(Kenya) Commercial Bank	2	2	5	9
8	Posta Kenya	2			2
9	(Algeria) GS Pétroliers*	1	3	3	7
10	(Algeria) ASW Bejaia	1			1
11	(Algeria) NC Bejaia		1	1	2
12	(Tunisia) CS Sfaxien		1		1
12	(Egypt) El Shams		1		1
12	(Morocco) FAR Rabat		1		1
14
14	(Tunisia) Al Hilal			1	1
14	(Seychelles) Cascade WVC			1	1
14	(Cameroon) AES Sonel			1	1
14	(Algeria) NJ de Chlef			1	1
14	Telkom Kenya			1	1
Total		36	34	31	101

* Includes club's accomplishments under former names (MC Alger and MP Alger).

== Wins by country ==
Rank	Country	Winners	Runners-up	Third Place	Total
2	Kenya	14	12	17	43
1	Egypt	14	13	4	31
3	Tunisia	6	4	3	13
4	Algeria	2	4	5	11
5	Morocco		1		1
6	Cameroon			1	1
6	Seychelles			1	1
Total		36	34	31	101
