= Postal Corporation of Kenya =

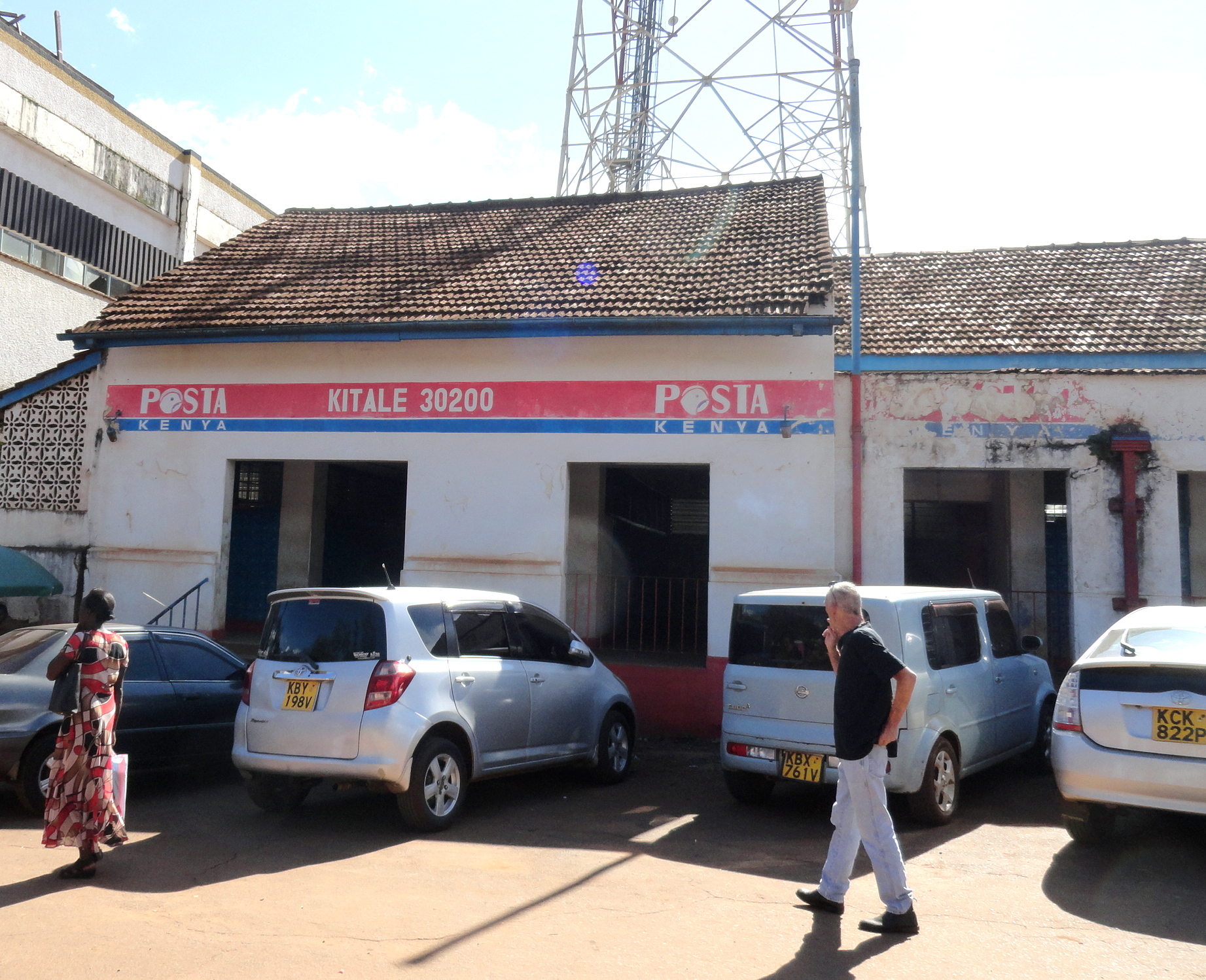
- Type: Privately held company
- Website: posta.co.ke

The Postal Corporation of Kenya is the company responsible for postal service in Kenya. It is also known as Posta Kenya.

Kenyan post system was formerly part of the Kenya Post & Telecommunication Corporation (KP&TC), which was split into Posta, the Communication Commission of Kenya (CCK) and Telkom Kenya in 1999.

== History ==
The postal history Kenya dates back to the 17th century. A Portuguese governor was installed in Mombasa in 1592, afterwards communication with the outside world intensified historical records states from 1610 onwards. The messages were carried by ship to Arabia then India and transmitted to Europe by overland route. Early letters from European missionaries date back to 1848 were sent from the hinterland to the Kenyan coast via African native runners. In 1877 letters from the coast were taken north to Aden by ships of the British Steam Navigation Company. The British East Africa Association developed and expanded a system of mail runners, while private traders and concessionaires organized their own postal services.

The Denhardt brothers, Gustav and Clemens Denhardt, organized a private postal system to facilitate communication for their trade operations and settlements in 1889-1890. To support this system, they issued distinctive postage stamps. The Denhardt's' postal service operated alongside the broader efforts of other traders and organizations until the establishment of an official postal service in British East Africa in 1890.The German office in Lamu closed in 1891.In May 1890, a formal postal system was introduced in British East Africa. Post offices were established in key locations, Kilindini-Mombasa, and Lamu. This marked the beginning of organized, modern postal services in the region.

In 1895 it was enjoined into the postal union of the imperial government. When the railway neared completion in 1906 the offices were moved from Mombasa to Nairobi on sixth avenue now Kenyatta avenue. Telegraph lines were extended 2896 Km all around British East Africa. The Railway sped up the delivery of mail to centres and towns all over the protectorate. Runners would deliver the letters the last 45 km from the railway centres.

On 1 July 1933, the postal union of the three East African countries making up the East Africa British Territory was strengthened by the East African Customs and Postal Union which became active in 1st may 1935. The cooperation remained until 1977 to be continued within the East African Community which, from 1930, will also include Tanganyika and, from 1964, Zanzibar. Kenya issues its first stamps as an individual country after it has gained independence in 1963.

== The Postal Corporation Of Kenya ==
The Postal Corporation Of Kenya was established by an Act Of Parliament (PCK Act 1998) and operates as a commercial public enterprise. The Corporation’s mandate includes provision of accessible, affordable and reliable postal services to all parts of Kenya as public postal license whereby communication through the post office forms part of the basic human right as is enshrined in the 1948 United Nations Charter.

Safaricom (NSE) and the Postal Corporation of Kenya have announced a partnership around the MPost service, with a goal of rolling out digital Post Office Boxes to more than 5 million additional customers across the country.

=== MPost ===
MPost is a digital service that converts your mobile phone into a postal address. It allows users to receive physical mail and packages using their mobile phone number as a postal address.

== See also ==
- List of national postal services#Africa
