= CS Sfaxien (women's volleyball) =

Tunisian volleyball club

- Full name: Club Sportif Sfaxien
- Short name: CSS
- Founded: 1928
- Ground: Raed Bejaoui Hall, Sfax (Capacity: 5,000)
- League: Tunisian Volleyball League
- 2022–23: 2nd Place
- Website: Club home page

Uniforms
Home	Away

The Club Sportif Sfaxien Volleyball Club (Arabic: النادي الرياضي الصفاقسي للكرة الطائرة للسيدات, often referred to as CSS) is one of CS Sfaxien women's club's sections that represent the club in Tunisia and international volleyball competitions, the club team based in Sfax.

== History ==
The Club Sportif Sfaxien is a Tunisian sports team founded in 1928 in Sfax. The club has won the Tunisian Championship for 8 times, the Tunisia cup 9 times, Internationally The Club still yet to have won any title.

== Technical and managerial staff ==
Name	Role	Nationality
Moncef Khemakhem	Manager	Tunisian
Hamdi Khannous	Team Coach	Tunisian
Anna Charfi	Assistant Coach	Tunisian
Monia Hosni	Physiotherapist	Tunisian

== Honours ==
=== National Achievements ===
- Tunisian League :

Winners (08 titles) : 1998–99, 2002–03, 2003–04, 2005–06, 2008–09, 2009–10, 2011–12, 2018–19
Runners-Up :

- Tunisian Cup :

Winners (10 cups) : 1999–20, 2004–05, 2007–08, 2008–09, 2011–12, 2012–13, 2013–14, 2017–18, 2018–2023–24
Runners-Up :

- Tunisian Super Cup :

Winners (06 Super cups) : 2004–05, 2006–07, 2008–09, 2017–18, 2018–19, 2022–23
Runners-Up (3) : 2016–17, 2019–20, 2020–21

=== Regional honours ===
- African Club Championship :

Runners up (1) : 2021

- Arab Clubs Championship :

Winners (1 cup) : 2019
Runners-Up (2) : 1999, 2017
Bronze Medalist (2) : 2000, 2020

== Squad 2025–26 ==
No.	Name	Nationality	Position	Height (cm)	Birth Year
7	Hiba Fatnassi	Tunisia	Setter	173	2003
1	Basma Awled Ali	Tunisia	Outside Hitter	—	—
2	Sirine Attiallah	Tunisia	Outside Hitter	177	2007
3	Dhouha Engazou	Tunisia	Outside Hitter	180	2003
8	Noura Benhlima	Tunisia	Outside Hitter	—	—
9	Khadija Louati	Tunisia	Outside Hitter	183	2010
18	Malak Allouch	Tunisia	Outside Hitter	180	2010
6	Ahlem Baazaoui	Tunisia	Middle-blocker	184	2003
10	Nada Tannoubi	Tunisia	Libero	170	2005
5	Farah Khiari	Tunisia	Universal	—	—
12	Ines Chkili	Tunisia	Universal	—	—

Name	Nationality	Role
Abdelaziz Ben Abdallah	Tunisia	Head coach

== See also ==
- CS Sfaxien
- CS Sfaxien (volleyball)
- CS Sfaxien Women's Basketball
