= Lebanese Men's Volleyball League =

- Current season, competition or edition: 2025–26 Lebanese League
- Sport: Volleyball
- First season: 1952; 74 years ago
- Administrator: LVF
- No. of teams: 12 teams
- Country: Lebanon
- Confederation: AVC
- Continent: Asia
- Most recent champion: CJS Batroun (1st title) (2025–26)
- Most titles: CJ Baouchrieh (17 titles)
- Level on pyramid: Level 1
- Relegation to: National 2
- Domestic cups: Lebanese Cup; Lebanese Super Cup
- International cups: AVC Champions League; Arab Clubs Championship

The Lebanese First Division Volleyball League (Arabic: دوري الدرجة الاولى اللبناني لكرة الطائرة رجال) is the highest level of men's volleyball competition in Lebanon. It is organized and managed by the Lebanese Volleyball Federation.

The league was established in 1952, three years after the formation of the Lebanese Volleyball Federation. It was held continuously from the 1952–53 season through 1973–74, with the sole exception of the 1958–59 season, which was cancelled. During this period, the competition was largely dominated by clubs such as Club du Sacré Cœur and CJ Baouchrieh.

The league was suspended between 1975 and 1990 due to the ongoing Lebanese Civil War. Following the end of the conflict, the federation relaunched the competition for the 1994–95 season. Since then, the league has been held annually, featuring 12 clubs from across the country competing for the national championship.

== Titles by Clubs ==
Rank	Team	Titles
1	CJ Baouchrieh	17
2	Club du Sacré Cœur	10
3	SpeedBall Chekka	5
4	Club Al Anwar	4
5	Zahra Club	2
5	Ghazir Club	2
5	Al Aamal Bikfaya	2
5	Al Kahraba Beirut	2
9	Intilak Anfeh	1
9	CJS Batroun	1
9	Al Fida Saida	1
9	Apotres Jounieh	1

== Winners list ==
Season	Champion
1952–53	Club du Sacré Cœur
1953–54	Club du Sacré Cœur
1954–55	Club du Sacré Cœur
1955–56	Club du Sacré Cœur
1956–57	Club du Sacré Cœur
1957–58	Al Aamal Bikfaya
1959–60	Al Fida Saida
1960–61	Al Aamal Bikfaya
1961–62	Al Kahraba Beirut
1962–63	Al Kahraba Beirut
1963–64	Club du Sacré Cœur
1964–65	Club du Sacré Cœur
1965–66	Apotres Jounieh
1966–67	Club du Sacré Cœur
1967–68	Club du Sacré Cœur
1968–69	Club du Sacré Cœur
1969–70	Baouchrieh

Season	Champion
1970–71	Baouchrieh
1971–72	Baouchrieh
1972–73	Baouchrieh
1973–74	Baouchrieh
1994–95	Baouchrieh
1995–96	Baouchrieh
1996–97	Baouchrieh
1997–98	Baouchrieh
1998–99	Baouchrieh
1999–00	Baouchrieh
2000–01	Cancelled
2001–02	Baouchrieh
2002–03	Ghazir Club
2003–04	Ghazir Club
2004–05	Intilak Anfeh
2005–06	Baouchrieh
2006–07	Baouchrieh

Season	Champion
2007–08	Club Al Anwar
2008–09	Baouchrieh
2009–10	Club Al Anwar
2010–11	Club Al Anwar
2011–12	Baouchrieh
2012–13	Club Al Anwar
2013–14	Baouchrieh
2014–15	Zahra Club
2015–16	Zahra Club
2016–17	SpeedBall Chekka
2017–18	SpeedBall Chekka
2018–19	SpeedBall Chekka
2021–22	SpeedBall Chekka
2022–23	Cancelled
2023–24	SpeedBall Chekka
2024–25	CJS Batroun
2025–26	

Sources :
