= Club Féminine de Carthage =

Tunisian volleyball club

Club Feminine de Carthage
- Full name: Club Feminine de Carthage
- Short name: CFC
- Founded: 2011
- Ground: Salle Couverte Carthage, Carthage
- Chairman: (Tunisia) Khaled Ben Amor
- Manager: (Tunisia) Kamel Rekaya
- League: Tunisian Volleyball League
- 2022–23: 1st Place
- Website: Club home page

Uniforms
Home	Away

Club Feminine de carthage (Arabic: النادي النسائي بقرطاج, often referred to as CFC) is a Tunisian Women's Volleyball Club that was founded since 2011 in Carthage, Tunis and Currently they Play in Tunisian Volleyball 1st Division.

== Previous Names ==
- Club Femenine de Carthage (2011—Present)

== Honours ==
=== National Achievements ===
- Tunisian Championship :

Winners (10) : 2013, 2014, 2015, 2016, 2017, 2018, 2020, 2021, 2022, 2023
Runners up (0) :

- Tunisian Cup :

Winners (7) : 2015, 2016, 2017, 2020, 2021, 2022, 2023
Runners up (3) : 2012, 2014, 2018

- Tunisian Super Cup :

Winners (4) : 2017, 2020, 2021, 2022
Runners up (2) : 2018, 2019

=== International Achievements ===
- African Club Championship :

Winners (2) : 2017, 2021
Runners up (3) : 2016, 2018, 2019
Third place (2) : 2015, 2023

== Team roster ==
2025—26

No.	Name	Nationality	Position	Height (cm)	Birth Year
10	Nouha Chekili	Tunisia	Setter	175	2004
—	Ghofrane Bensoltan	Tunisia	Setter	181	1998
14	Christelle Makiese Ndongo	DR Congo	Opposite	169	2004
18	Hajer Karamosly	Tunisia	Opposite	185	2010
2	Mouna Hamouda	Tunisia	Outside Hitter	177	1996
6	Jihen Mohamed	Tunisia	Outside Hitter	174	1996
13	Sirine Bouraoui	Tunisia	Outside Hitter	182	1998
—	Sinda Bouzidi	Tunisia	Outside Hitter	182	2010
3	Maroua Boughanmi	Tunisia	Middle-blocker	180	1993
17	Sahar Jenhani	Tunisia	Middle-blocker	184	2005
4	Samah Kritli	Tunisia	Libero	—	—
11	Lina Gtari	Tunisia	Libero	150	2008
5	Mayssem Jeridi	Tunisia	Universal	177	2009

Name	Nationality	Role
Mourad Ben Slimane	Tunisia	Statistician
Hassine Souissi	Tunisia	Physical preparation coach

== Head coaches ==
Dates	Name
→	
→	
→	
→	
→	
→	

As of 2017
