= Ariana University women's volleyball =

Tunisian volleyball club

Ariana University
- Founded: 1995
- Ground: Salle Ariana, Ariana (Capacity: 1,500)
- Chairman: Othmen Sbei
- Manager: Mohamed Ali Hentati
- League: Tunisian Volleyball League
- 2016–17: 4th Place
- Website: Club home page

Uniforms
Home	Away

Ariana University Volleyball Club (Arabic: النادي الجامعي باريانة, English: Ariana University or UCA) is a Tunisian women's Volleyball team based in Ariana Town, founded in 1995. It is currently playing in the Tunisian Women's Volleyball League Top Division, The Club won the Tunisian Championship in 1998 and the Tunisian Volleyball Cup in 1997.

== Honours ==
=== National titles ===
- Tunisian Volleyball League 1 :

Champions : 1997–98
Vice Champion : 1998–99

- Tunisian Volleyball Cup 1 :

Champions : 1996–97
Runners Up : 2005–06, 2009–10

=== Regional honours ===
- Arab Clubs Championship 0 :

Runners-up : 1998
Bronze Medalist : 1999

== Current squad 2017–18 ==
Ariana University Volleyball roster
Players List: 01 (Tunisia) Rania Jaghoubi; 02 (Tunisia) Feriel Sassi; 03 (Tunisia) Cirine Amar; 04 (Tunisia) Tasnim Souiden; 05 (Tunisia) Chaima Oueslati; 06 (Tunisia) Safa Ben Naceur; 07 (Tunisia) Nedra Abassi; 08 (Tunisia) Cirine Charabi; 09 (Tunisia) Siwar Habassi; 10 (Tunisia) Wissal Ghazouani; 11 (Tunisia) Esma M’naouar; 12 (Tunisia) Salma Belkhir	Technical staff: Head coach : (Tunisia) Mohamed Ali Hentati; Assistant coach : (Tunisia) Abdessatar Joudi; Club doctor : (Tunisia) Unknown
