= Hamdi Meddeb =

Tunisian businessman

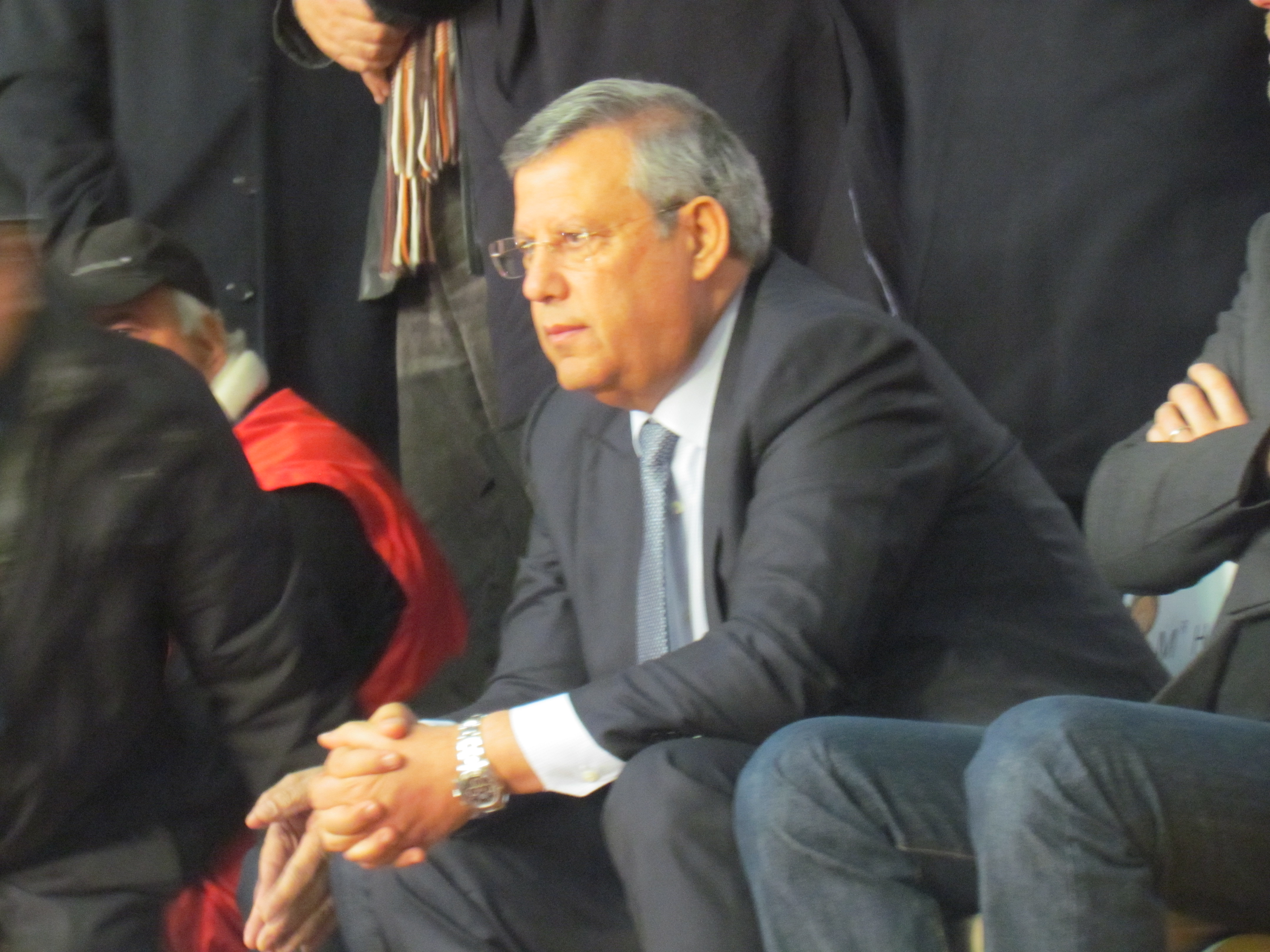
- Born: Mohamed Meddeb; April 8, 1952 (age 74); Tunis
- Occupations: Businessman, investor
- Years active: 1978–present
- Known for: Presidency of Espérance Sportive de Tunis

Hamdi Meddeb (born: Mohamed Meddeb in 1952) is a Tunisian businessman, investor, and the current president of Espérance Sportive de Tunis, the oldest sports club in Tunisia.

== Early life ==
Meddeb had played soccer for Espérance Sportive de Tunis's youth team from 1967 to 1971.

== Business ==
In 1978, he took over his family business and founded the Tunisian Company for Food Industries (French: la Société Tunisienne des Industries Alimentaires, STIAL). In 1997, STIAL partenered with Danone—giving it a 50 percent stake in the business—to form Délice Danone. Meddeb partnered with the British company Virgin Cola in 2002 to produce soft drinks for the Tunisian market, but the partnership lasted only four years. In 2014, Meddeb introduced Délice Holding into Tunis Stock Exchange.

== Espérance Sportive de Tunis (EST) ==
After the 1990s Espérance golden age with president Slim Chiboub, fans were worried about who is going to preside over the club when Chiboub left in 2004. Businessman Aziz Zouhir held the presidency for two years and nine months, from November 2004 to August 2007. Hamdi Meddeb became the president of Espérance Sportive de Tunis on 10 August 2007. Prior to becoming the next president, Meddeb was an unknown to most Tunisians, and even most EST fans. After retiring from the Espérance's youth team as a player in the early 1970s, Hamdi Meddeb dedicated himself to his business, but stayed close to Espérance and had held different administrative roles—including being a continuous financier of the club—through the years.

In June 2021, Meddeb expressed his intention to resign and leave the club. The consensus among the members and the fans was against his departure. Eventually, he reexamined his possible resignation and stayed.

Although Hamdi Meddeb is often invited and met by presidents and prime ministers of Tunisia, he rarely appears in the media or gives interviews.

== Controversies ==
After the collapse of the regime in Tunisia on 14 January 2011, several businessmen and captains of industries were accused of corruption and their support for Zine El Abidine Ben Ali in his 2009 presidential campaign. Meddeb's friendship with Mohamed Sakher El Materi, Ben Ali's son-in-law, caused many rumors to spread about his reputation as a businessman. He partnered with Matri and was among the early investors for Zitouna Bank. In November 2010, Meddeb and Matri bought a 25 percent stake in Tunisiana (later rebranded as Ooredoo Tunisia).

== See also ==
- Slim Chiboub
- Hédi Baccouche
