= Union Sportive de Carthage Women's Volleyball =

Tunisian volleyball club

Union Sportive de Carthage WVB
- Full name: Union Sportive de Carthage
- Short name: USC
- Founded: 1994
- Ground: Salle Carthage, Carthage, Tunis (Capacity: 500)
- League: Tunisian Volleyball League
- 2016–17: 3rd Place
- Website: Club home page

Uniforms
Home	Away

Union Sportive de Carthage Women's Volleyball Club (Arabic: نادي اتحاد قرطاج للكرة الطائرة سيدات, English: Carthage Union Volleyball Club or USC) is a Tunisian women's Volleyball team based in Carthage, Tunis Town Since the year 1994 and it is currently playing in the Tunisian Women's Volleyball League Top Division, The Club have some success when they won the Tunisian Championship for 2 Occasions also they have the Tunisian Volleyball Cup Crown for 2 times.

== Honours ==
=== National titles ===
- Tunisian Volleyball League 2 :

Champions : 2007–08, 2010–11
Vice Champion :

- Tunisian Volleyball Cup 2 :

Champions : 2009–10, 2010–11
Runners Up :

== Current squad 2017–18 ==
US Carthage Volleyball roster
Players List: 0? (Tunisia) Asma Ben Chaabene; 0? (Tunisia) Snoussi Rahma; 0? (Tunisia) Mouna Zitouni; 0? (Tunisia) Haloula Ferchichi; 0? (Tunisia) Mariem Mami; 0? (Tunisia) Sonya Mahfoudhi; 0? (Tunisia) Dadou Amdouni; 0? (Tunisia) Marwa Barhoumi; 0? (Tunisia) Unknown; 0? (Tunisia) Unknown; 0? (Tunisia) Unknown; 0? (Tunisia) Unknown	Technical staff: Head coach : (Tunisia) Rached; Assistant coach : (Tunisia) Haythem; Club doctor : (Tunisia)

== Head coaches ==
This is a list of the senior team's head coaches in the recent years.

Dates	Name
→	
→	
→	
→	
→	
→	

As of 2018
