= Aya El Shamy =

Egyptian volleyball player (born 1995)

Personal information
- Nationality: Egyptian
- Born: 27 November 1995 (age 30)

Volleyball information
- Number: 11 (national team)

Career
Years	Teams
2011	(Egypt) El Shams Club

National team
2011	Egypt

Aya El Shamy (born 27 November 1995) is an Egyptian female volleyball player. She was part of the Egypt women's national volleyball team.

She won the gold medal at the 2011 Pan Arab Games. On club level, she played for El Shams Club in 2011.
