= Women's Arab volleyball clubs championship =

Women's Arab Volleyball Clubs Championship
- Current season, competition or edition: 2020 Women's Arab Volleyball Clubs Championship
- Sport: Volleyball
- Founded: 1998
- First season: 1998
- Country: AVA members
- Most recent champion: (Algeria) GSP Alger (1st title)
- Most titles: (Egypt) Al Ahly SC (8 titles)
- Website: http://www.awst.ae/reg/#

The Women's Arab Clubs Champions Championship is a sport competition for club volleyball teams, currently held annually and organized by the Arab Volleyball Association. the first edition was played in Tunisia in 1998.

Year	Host	Champion	Score	Runner-up	Third-place
1998	(Tunisia) Tunis	(Egypt) Al Ahly SC	3–2	(Tunisia) Université de l'Ariana	(Tunisia) CS Hilalien
1999	(Egypt) Cairo	(Egypt) Al Ahly SC	3–0	(Tunisia) CS Sfaxien	(Tunisia) Université de l'Ariana
2000	(Tunisia) Sfax	(Egypt) Al Ahly SC	3–0	(Algeria) MC Alger	(Tunisia) CS Sfaxien
2001	Not Held
2002	Not Held
2003	Not Held
2004	Not Held
2005	(Syria) Damascus	(Egypt) Al Ahly SC	3–0	(Algeria) Ghalia Sportif Chlef	Shabab Jordan
2006	Not Held
2007	(Syria) Damascus	(Egypt) Al Ahly SC	3–0	(Algeria) NC de Béjaïa	N/A
2008	Not Held
2009	(Egypt) Cairo	(Egypt) Al Ahly SC	3–1	(Egypt) El Shams Club	(Syria) Al-Shorta SC
2010	Not Held
2011	Not Held
2012	Not Held
2013	Not Held
2014	Not Held
2015	Not Held
2016	(Egypt) Cairo	(Egypt) Al Ahly SC	3–0	(Algeria) GSP Alger	(Jordan) De La Salle
2017	(Egypt) Cairo	(Egypt) Al Ahly SC	3–0	(Tunisia) CS Sfaxien	(Algeria) GSP Alger
2019	(Egypt) Cairo	(Tunisia) CS Sfaxien	3–0	(Egypt) Al Ahly SC	(Egypt) Sporting
2020	(United Arab Emirates) Sharjah	(Algeria) GSP Alger	3–0	(Egypt) Sporting	(Tunisia) CS Sfaxien

== See also ==
- Arab Clubs Championship (volleyball)
