= Telkom Kenya =

Kenyan telecommunications company

- Type: Public private partnership
- Industry: Telecommunications
- Founded: 5 April 1999; 27 years ago
- Headquarters: Nairobi, Kenya
- Key people: Eddy Njoroge (chairman); Mugo Kibati (chief executive officer)
- Products: Telecommunications services Internet services
- Revenue: KSh.40 billion/= (2010)
- Website: Official website

Telkom Kenya is an integrated telecommunications provider in Kenya. It was previously a part of the Kenya Posts and Telecommunications Corporation (KPTC) which was the sole provider of both postal and telecommunication services. The company was established as a telecommunications operator in April 1999, after the split of KPTC into the Communications Commission of Kenya (CCK), the Postal Corporation of Kenya (POSTA) and Telkom Kenya. As of 2023, the company is fully owned by the Government of Kenya.

== Services ==
The company operates and maintains the infrastructure over which Kenya's various internet service providers operate. As of 2004, most internet service was provided via dial-up service. Jambonet, an important Kenyan ISP, is a subsidiary of Telkom Kenya. It also offers mobile GSM voice and high speed internet services under the Telkom brand, in which it is the 3rd in market share after Safaricom and Airtel Kenya. In 2018, it was announced that Airtel Kenya was considering a merger with Telkom Kenya. In March 2018, the company resumed a mobile-money service that it had dropped in 2017. Referred to as T-kash, the service is a direct competitor to the M-pesa service, offered by market-leader Safaricom.

== History ==
In 2007 France Télécom (now Orange S.A.) acquired 51% of Telkom Kenya's shares at a cost of US$390 million. In November 2012, the shareholding structure changed due to a decision by the Kenyan government to convert its shareholder loans at that time, into equity in order to ease Telkom Kenya's debt burden. It was subsequently confirmed that the Kenya government would retain 40% shareholding down from 49% with the remaining shares held by France Télécom. In January 2013, France Télécom increased its stake in Telkom Kenya to 70% as a consequence of the government's failure to provide its full portion of the 2012 funding. In June 2017, the firm was re-branded from "Orange Kenya" to "Telkom Kenya".

== Past shareholding ==
On November 9, 2015, Helios Investment Partners announced that they were going to purchase France Télécom's entire stake in Telkom Kenya.

Subsequent to the agreement to buy, Helios negotiated with the Kenyan government to own 40 percent in the new joint venture, with the investment firm retaining 60 percent. In June 2016, final regulatory approval was received for the deal to proceed. In October 2022, the Kenyan government acquired the remaining 60% of Telkom Kenya from Helios in a $50.4 million USD deal. At that time, the Kenyan government owned 100 percent of Telkom Kenya.

== Current shareholding ==
In October 2023, Infrastructure Corporation of Africa LLC (ICA), based in the United Arab Emirates was selected to acquire the 60 percent shareholding, previously owned by Helios Investment Partners. Subject to all the approvals and documentation, the shareholding will look as depicted in the table below.

Telkom Kenya stock ownership
Rank	Name of owner	Domicile	Percentage ownership
1	Infrastructure Corporation of Africa LLC	United Arab Emirates	60.0
2	Government of Kenya	Kenya	40.0
	Total		100.0

== See also ==
- Kenya Internet Exchange
