= Kotla =

Kotla (lit. 'citadel' in Indic languages) may refer to:

== Places ==
=== India ===
- Kotla, Himachal Pradesh, a small hill town in Kangra district, Himachal Pradesh
- Kotla Sultan Singh, a village in Amritsar district, Punjab State
- Kotla, Punjab, a village in Jalandhar district, Punjab State
- Kotla, Nuh, a village in Nuh district, Haryana
- Malerkotla, an erstwhile princely State and city in Punjab

=== Pakistan ===
- Kotla, Bagh, a village and tourist resort in Azad Kashmir
- Kotla Arab Ali Khan, a town in Gujrat District, Punjab
- Kotla Haji Shah, a village in Kharian Tehsil, Gujrat District, Punjab
- Kotla Mohsin Khan, a historic gate in Peshawar, Khyber Pakhtunkhwa
- Kotla Musa Khan, a city south of Bahawalpur District, Punjab
- Kotla tando, a village in Gujrat District, Punjab

=== Other places ===
- Kotla, Poland, a village in Lower Silesia

== Other uses ==
- Kotla (surname)

== See also ==
- Feroz Shah Kotla, a 14th-century fortress in Delhi, India
- Feroz Shah Kotla Ground, a cricket ground in New Delhi, India
- Kotlas (disambiguation)
- Kolta (disambiguation)
- Kota (disambiguation)
