= Kolta =

Kolta may refer to:

- Kolta, Slovakia, a village and municipality in Slovakia
- Nemeskolta, known pre-1899 as Kolta, a village in Hungary
- Kolta, Ethiopia, a settlement in the Gofa Zone of Ethiopia
- Kolta people, or Koli, a social group of India
- Buatier De Kolta (1845–1903), French magician

== See also ==
- Colta (disambiguation)
- Kotla (disambiguation)
