= Evangelical Parish of the Augsburg Confession in Włocławek =

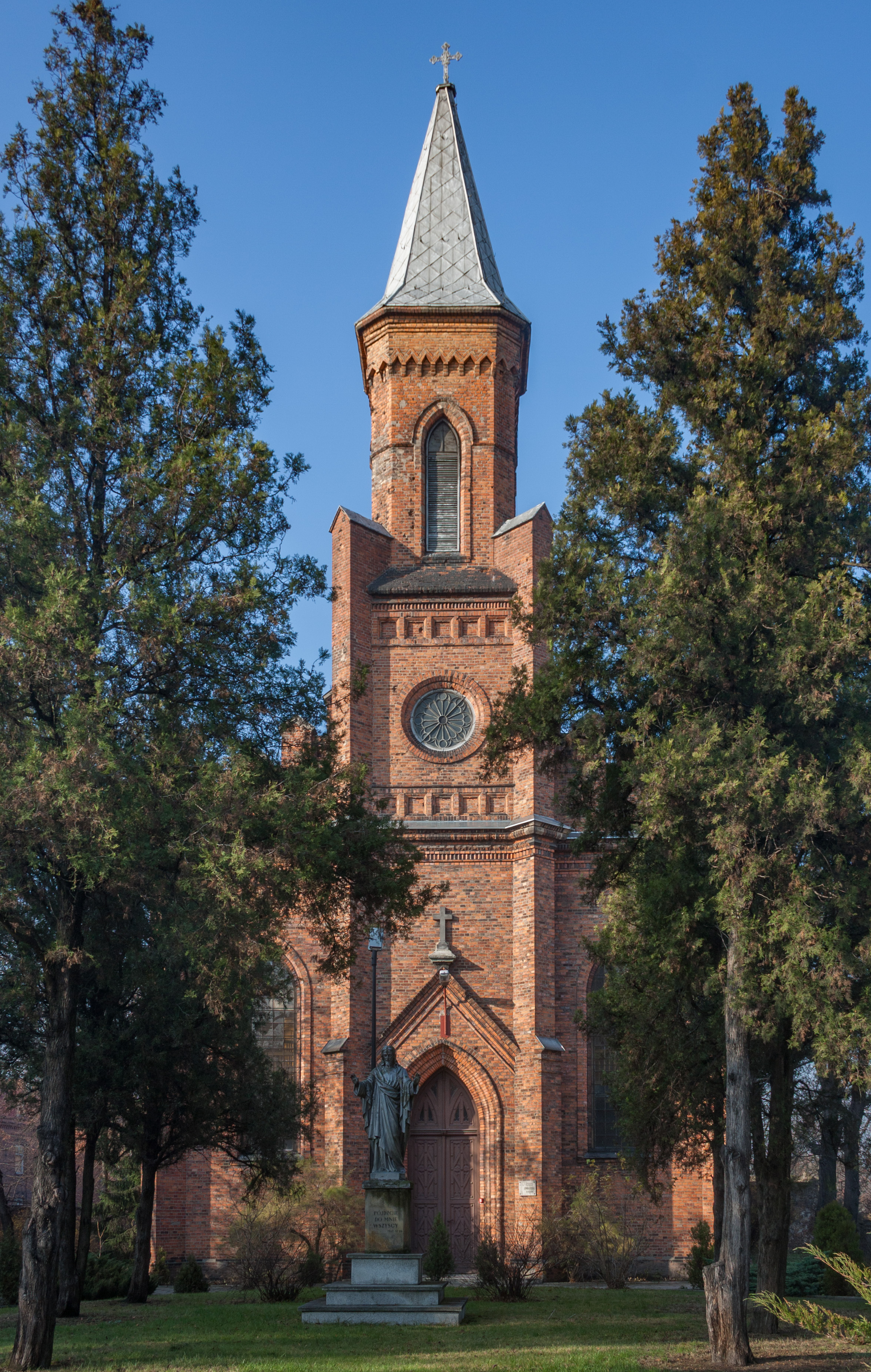
The parish church

The Evangelical Parish of the Augsburg Confession in Włocławek – an evangelical parish belonging to the diocese of Pomerania and Wielkopolska, located on Brzeska Street.

== History ==
=== Beginnings of the evangelical settlement, 1793-1829 ===
From the 16th to 19th century the region of Kujawy was a place where immigrants from Germany and the Netherlands settled. The first of the settlers were refugees from Germany, which was engaged in a civil war during the Reformation. In the later centuries, especially in the 18th century, immigrants settled voluntarily in numerous areas abandoned by Poles who died out or became impoverished as a result of wars and epidemics that struck the region at that time. From the very beginning, the settlers were of both Catholic and Evangelical denominations.

Until 1793 Włocławek was a town ruled by the bishop, who forbade people of other than Catholic faith to settle there. After the Second Partition of Poland, Włocławek was annexed by Prussia. The new town authorities lifted the ban on settling for non-Catholics.

The first Evangelical settlers in Włocławek came mainly from the surrounding areas, which had already been part of the Kingdom of Prussia before the partitions, i.e. Toruń, Bydgoszcz, Grudziądz or Gdańsk. Some families, however, came from the depths of Germany, including Dresden, Hamburg, Potsdam. In the years 1793-1821 these families celebrated services in their own homes, to which clergy from neighbouring towns were invited. Between 1796 and 1797, services were also held in the now nonexistent St. Stanislaus Cathedral. Until their own parish was established, Evangelicals were given sacraments in Catholic Churches.

Education for Evangelical youth has been organized since the beginning of the community. Starting from 1834 the parish had its own school building, located on the corner of Brzeska and Piekarska streets.

In 1818, the Evangelical community applied to the authorities of the Congress Kingdom for permission to hold masses in the 17th century wooden church of St Adalbert. The Government Commission of Religion and Public Enlightenment gave its consent on 24 June 1820. The then bishop of Kujawy and Kalisz, Andrzej Wołłowicz also gave his consent and on 17-18 March 1821 he agreed to lease the church of St. Adalbert to the Evangelical community free of charge. The first Lutheran service was celebrated on 31 May 1821 by Pastor Georg Ortmann.

=== From the creation of the parish until the end of World War II, 1829-1945 ===
The Evangelical-Augsburg parish in Włocławek was founded in 1829. At the time of its foundation it had 2,414 members.

In the years 1831-1832 a rectory building in the classicist style was built next to the church at 22 Brzeska street. The building, which still exists today, was thoroughly rebuilt in 1881 as well as in the 1980s. It currently houses a winter chapel.

In 1850, the heir of Siewiersk, Frederick Wilhelm Cords, left his estate to be used for building a new church of the parish in Włocławek, as well as a school and a hospital for Lutherans. The construction of the church was also supported by parishioners' donations and government subsidies.

In the years 1877-1881 (according to other sources in 1882-1884) a new brick church was built in neo-Gothic style, designed by Francis Tournelle. Its construction was completed in 1884. In 1881 the former Church of St. Adalbert was demolished.

At the beginning of the twentieth century, the number of the faithful increased rapidly. This was related to the assimilation of the German population and the general development of Włocławek as an industrial centre. On the eve of the outbreak of the First World War, the parish had already reached the number of about 3,000 people. This number was maintained for about twenty years. There were even plans to expand the church.

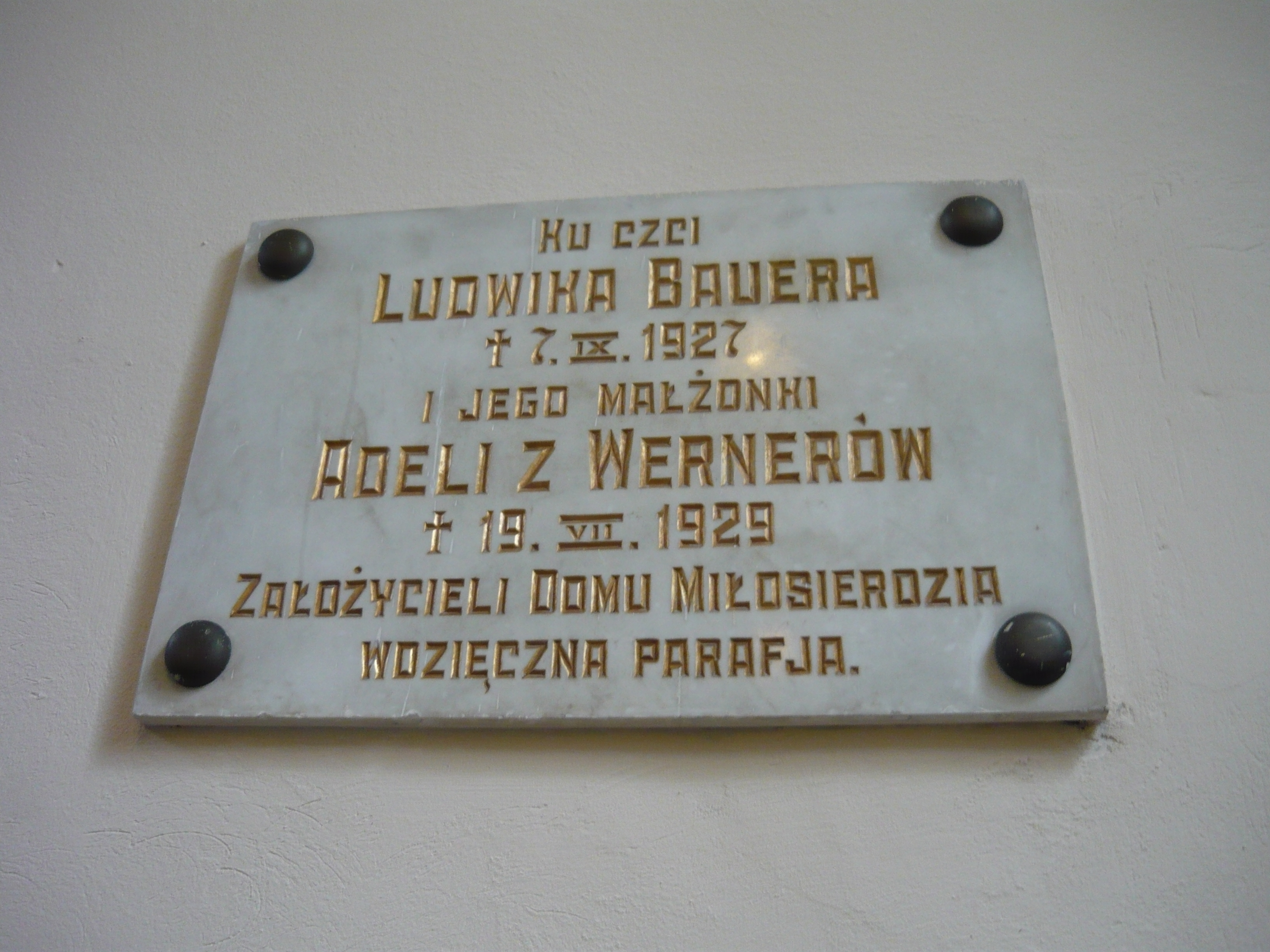
The parish appreciated the merits of Ludwig and Adela Bauer by displaying a commemorative plaque in the Church.

In 1905 Adela and Ludwik Bauer founded an orphanage house in the parish (4 Słowackiego Street) and the Evangelical House of Mercy (4a Słowackiego Street), where the elderly and crippled were taken care of. In 1908 they also founded a new building for the parish school. Both the school and the nursing home were named after Friedrich Wilhelm Cords. The Evangelical House of Mercy operated until 1945. Today, the building is out of operation. The Bauer family are also founders of a forged fence on a brick wall on the side of Brzeska Street, built in 1897. There is a plaque commemorating the two in the Church.

At that time, until the outbreak of World War II the parish ran five cantorates in municipalities: Dobiegniewo, Falborz, Łęg, Śmiłowice and Wieniec and schools in towns of: Modzerowo and Krzywa Góra (for the Polish population) and in Włocławek, Łęg-Witoszyn and Sarnówka (for the German population). There were numerous associations in the parish, e.g. the Evangelical Youth Society.

The church tower was significantly damaged on 20 January 1945. Soldiers of the Nazi army (of Latvian nationality) hid there and established a firing position equipped with a machine gun. From there, they attacked soldiers of the Soviet army located on present-day Freedom Square. In response, the Russians fired a volley of tank cannons towards the tower. The tower was rebuilt in the years 1947-1951.

=== Polish People's Republic and the present day, since 1945 ===
After World War II about 600 people remained in the parish. Under the Polish People's Republic, almost all of the parish's assets, including the rectory, were occupied by the state. It was partially recovered after the fall of the Polish People's Republic in 1989.

The church was renovated at the turn of 2008 and 2009. Nearly 150 coffin boards from the years 1840-1890 were found in the attic of the church. It was decided to catalogue, describe and restore them, which the parish did in cooperation with Izabela Drozd, a student of the University of the Third Age in Włocławek, Towarzystwo Inicjatyw Twórczych "ę" and the Polish-American Freedom Foundation. The lapidarium was opened on June 13, 2012, in the former cemetery chapel. The discovery inspired Izabela Drozd to carry out research on former Evangelical cemeteries throughout the region. The project entitled "Lost traces of the Evangelical community in Włocławek and its surrounding area" is still carried out under the patronage of the University of the Third Age. Apart from cataloguing and restoring tombstones, it also provides lectures and creates tourist trails, in cooperation with history teachers and the local branch of the Polish Tourist and Sightseeing Society.

In the second decade of the 21st century, the Church underwent further renovations. The church bell drive, gutters and electrical installation were replaced. The new illumination of the altar was installed. A new entrance gate in the fence on the side of Słowackiego Street was also installed. The night illumination of the church was completed with the support of the Włocławek Municipality.

The Evangelical Parish in Włocławek organizes history lessons in cooperation with schools[2]. During the Week of Prayers for Christian Unity, the Evangelicals of Włocławek invite Catholics to the services in their Temple.
