= Głogów Tower =

Coordinates: 51°23′53″N 16°12′14″E

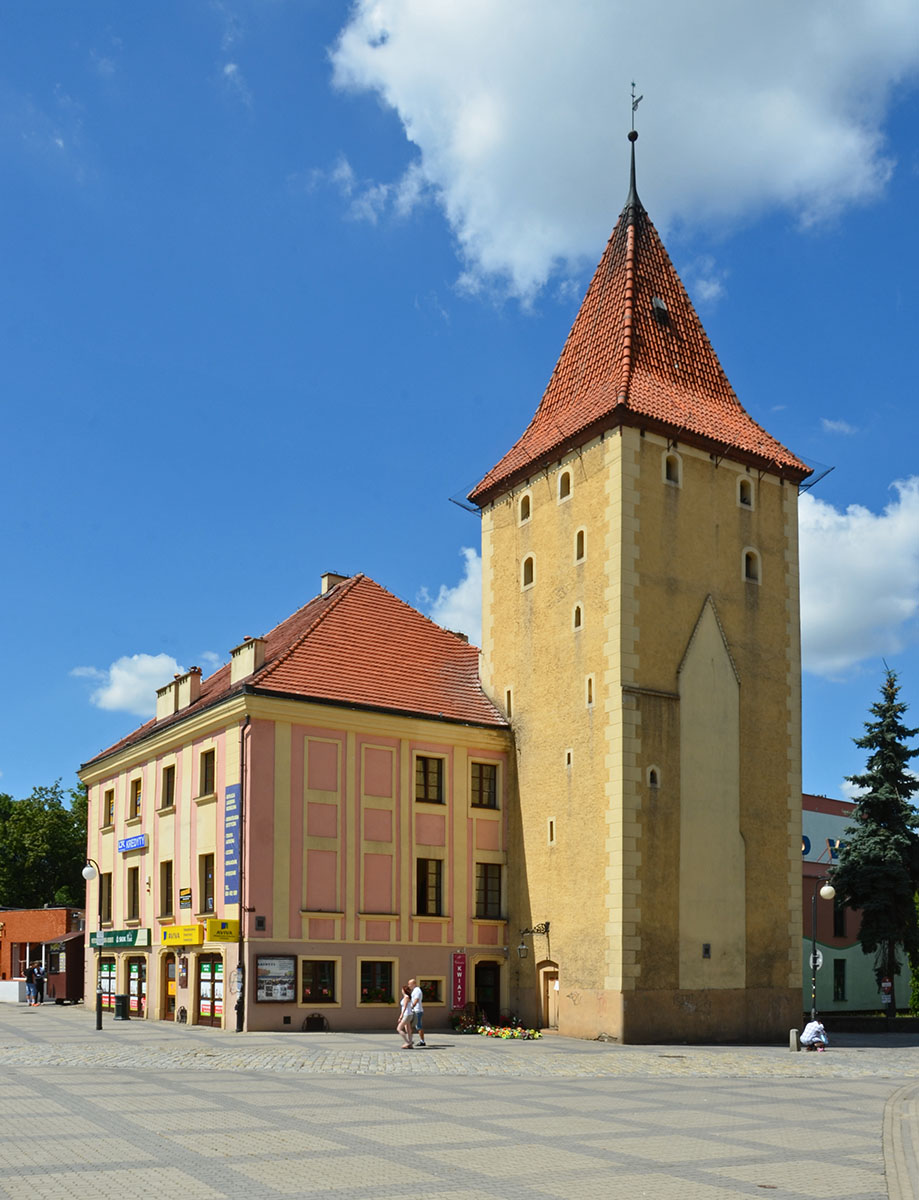
The Głogów Tower

The Głogów Tower (German: Pulverturm, Glogauer Torturm) is a Gothic building from the mid-14th century in Lubin, Lower Silesian Voivodeship, Poland, located in the northwestern part of the market square.

== Description ==
A Gothic building erected on a square plan, dating back to the construction of the town walls in the mid-14th century, enlarged in the 16th century. Rebuilt again in the 18th century and in the 19th century. The lower parts were made of stone and brick, the higher ones only of brick. The helmet of the tower dates back to the 19th century. The Głogów Gate consists of a gate building, adjacent to the tower from the north, and a rampart gate in front of the walls. The gate building had a 6 m high vaulted passage with a drawbridge, originally 10 m high, later 20 m high. There used to be a double defensive wall at the gate and a triple moat with three bridges, one of which was a drawbridge. A three-story building from the 18th century was once attached to the northeastern wall of the tower.

== Present day ==
Lubin's characteristic building is a six-storey tower gate. The building was erected on a square plan. The lower parts of the tower are made of stone and brick, while the upper parts are made only of brick. The façade is covered with plaster with rusticated corners. Gothic windows in stone frames of various sizes are irregularly arranged throughout the building, the larger ones in the upper part of the tower, the smaller ones in the lower part. The building is covered with a high, hipped ceramic roof. On the northern wall, there is a trace of the defensive wall's filling, which shows the height of the original town fortifications.

== Functions ==
In the 17th and 18th centuries the tower served as a city prison, which saved it from demolition. In 1908 the tower became the seat of the city museum, and it survived in this role until 1945. During the fights for the city at the end of World War II the tower was seriously damaged, and it was not until 1957 that it was saved from progressing devastation. It was used by PTTK (Polish Tourist and Sightseeing Society) branch in Lubin as a youth hostel. Nowadays the tower is used by the Mountaineering Club "Problem", Association of Culture Creators, Society of Friends of the Lubin Region and Association of Graduates of High School No 1 in Lubin "Absolwent".
