= Manek Premchand =

Indian writer and historian

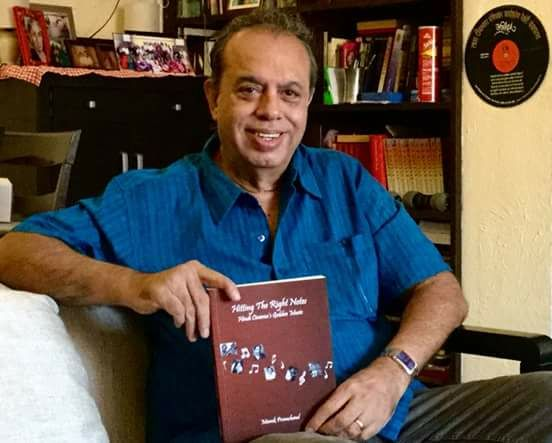
- Born: India
- Education: University of Mumbai
- Occupations: Writer; historian

Manek Premchand is an Indian writer and historian of film music at St. Xavier's College, Mumbai, who has written several books pertaining to the history of Indian film music and biographies of musicians. He has hosted shows on WorldSpace Satellite Radio and been a consultant with Saregama.

In 2003 he completed his first book, Yesterday's Melodies, Today's Memories. It was followed by Musical Moments from Hindi Films (2006). In 2010 he became part of the Mohammed Rafi Academy's governing body and two years later produced Romancing the Song (2012). He contributed an essay on Shivkumar Sharma in Shiv Kumar Sharma: The Man and His Music (2014), and released a biography of Talat Mahmood the following year. In Hitting the Right Notes (2016) he focuses on songwriters and composers, the difference the music made and the trends they produced. He devoted a chapter to Mubarak Begum in The Hindi Music Jukebox: Exploring Unforgettable Songs (2018), and has published a biography of Hemant Kumar in 2020. This book became the basis of an interactive online show in 2024.

== Early life and education ==
Manek Premchand spent his early childhood in Delhi as the youngest of six children. He was introduced to music by his mother who used to sing. By the age of ten, he had moved to Mumbai, where he became acquainted with the nearby qawwali singer Jaani Babu Qawwal, who arranged for him to learn the bulbul tarang. His education has included a diploma in journalism and an arts degree from the University of Mumbai. He received a two-year Senior Fellowship from the Ministry of Culture on the subject The Changing Face of Lyrics in Hindi Cinema. Prior to his career in writing he spent many years abroad. He is married to Lata Jagtiani, a writer and author of several books including Sindhi Reflections and Bhagavad Gita in 365 Days.

== Career ==
Premchand has hosted shows on WorldSpace Satellite Radio and been a consultant with Saregama, for whom he has compiled CDs. He is an adviser to the Manipal Academy of Higher Education's Manipal University Press. Manipal Film Festival (April 2013), organised by Communication Management Students of Manipal Institute of Communication (MIC) to celebrate 100 Years of Cinema, invited him as a speaker and honored him at the event. For students at Manipal University, he has lectured on several subjects, especially on The Evolution of Music in Hindi Cinema. He hosted a commemoration of 100 Years of Cinema arranged by Bharatiya Vidya Bhavans Kala Kendra, Mumbai. He did a video presentation as a salute to the city of Bombay (now Mumbai) for The Asiatic Society of Mumbai. Among the film and music related events he has anchored was an event to honor stars of yesteryear Shammi Kapoor, Waheeda Rehman and Vyjayanthimala, reported in The Financial Express. He has hosted an evening to celebrate yesteryear's playback singer Sudha Malhotra. He was the Guest of Honor to celebrate the music of composers Laxmikant-Pyarelal.

He served as a Jury Member for the Bengaluru Film Festival in March 2022, and was presented a memento by the governor of Karnataka for the same. He was invited as a speaker to the Mangalore Litfest in January 2024, where his recent book was also released.

Manek Premchand teaches broadcasting to post-graduate students at Xavier Institute of Communications, a part of St. Xavier's College, Mumbai, where he is a historian of film music. For his Mass Communications students, in July 2022, he conducted a field trip showing where the first cinema was shown in India, as also from where the first radio signals were sent. In October 2022, Premchand was felicitated for his work in writing on Hindi cinema by FLO, the ladies wing of FICCI (Federation of Indian Chamber of Commerce and Industry).

In January 2023, he presented an audiovisual of songs based on the streets of Mumbai in a program called "Zara Hatke Zara Bachke" for the Asiatic Society of Mumbai. He presented a masterclass at the Paridrishya Short Film festival in Bengaluru in February 2023: In February 2023 he curated a film music event on the theme of Unity in Diversity sponsored by Infosys Foundation and hosted by Bharatiya Vidya Bhavan Kala Kendra. More recently, in the summer of 2023, he did video presentations on singer Mohammed Rafi and hero-turned-villain, actor Ajit also for the Bharatiya Vidya Bhavan Kala Kendra, Mumbai. He curated and presented a talk and audiovisual on qawwalis down the years, also for Bharatiya Vidya Bhavan Kala Kendra in October 2023, and on Poet and Lyricist Shailendra for the Asiatic Society of Mumbai, in December 2023.

Recently Bharatiya Vidya Bhavan Kala Kendra, Mumbai, organized a special audio-visual show with Cine Society, as homage to legendary radio host Ameen Sayani after the latter died. The show was curated and presented by Manek Premchand and titled Celebrating Ameen Sayani, The Voice of India.

As guest of honour at the Paridrushya Film Festival in Mysuru on February 1, 2025, Premchand gave a masterclass on cinematographer V K Murthy. In February 2025, he also gave a masterclass on The Journey of Music in Indian Cinema for Mysuru Cinema Society.

Premchand was one of the presenters at the 3-day India Music Retreat, organised by Muse Music, along with Ustad Shujaat Khan, Kaushiki Chakraborty, Brian Silas, Sandeep Narayan, Wasifuddin Dagar, and others in Jaipur.

=== Writing ===
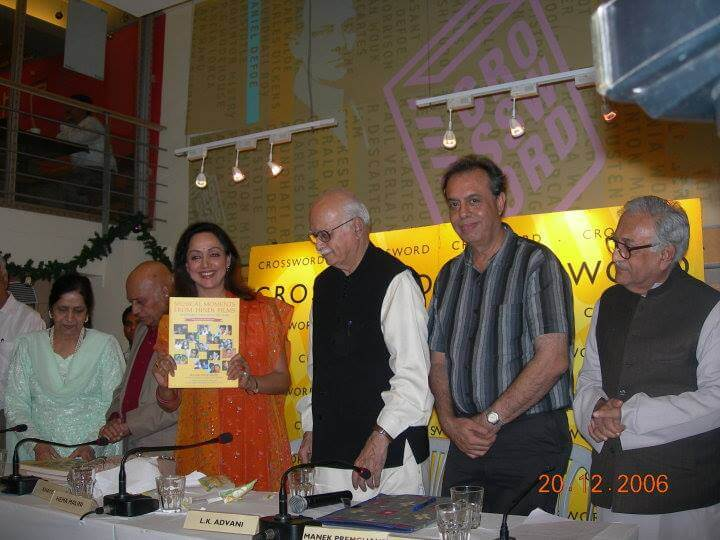
Book Release – Musical Moments From Hindi Films. L- R : Jagjit Kaur, Khayyam, Hema Malini, L K Advani, Manek Premchand and Ameen Sayani

Among the publications he wrote for were Hindustan Times, Mumbai Mirror, and Deccan Herald. He had a weekly column with DNA Jaipur to which he contributed film and music related articles. Among his essays is one about the contribution of Parsis in Hindi cinema, and an article on Dilip Kumar with a focus on his musical prowess and abilities for The Indian Performing Right Society Limited (IPRS). His writings have been cited by many authors. Recently, an article for The Indian Express quotes from his book on Majrooh Sultanpuri while reporting Finance Minister Nirmala Sitharaman's remarks about curtailing the freedom of artists. Jason Beaster Jones quotes him more than once in his book; Rachel Dwyer uses Premchand's book on Hemant Kumar to talk about Hemant Kumar's love for Rabindra Sangeet in her published article, and Shikha Jhingan's paper on classical ragas in film songs refers to his book Yesterday's Melodies Today's Memories.

Premchand began writing his first book, Yesterday's Melodies, Today's Memories, in January 1997, with the aim of giving songwriters, lyricists and singers of what he calls "the golden era of Hindi film music", credit. It took almost seven years to complete and was released in 2003. In his research he interviewed several people including singer Manna Dey, poet Majrooh and lyricist and composer Prem Dhawan. He estimated that 4,334 Hindi films made between 1930 and 1970 depicted around 36,000 songs. The book was described as having "excellent short sketches of the major composers, singers, lyricists, and arrangers" in Global Bollywood: Travels of Hindi Song and Dance. In 2018, the book saw its third reprint with enhanced content. While Gregory D Booth, the author of Behind the Curtain: Making Music in Mumbai's Film Studios (Oxford University Press, 2009), mentions Premchand's book several times in his own book, it has also been cited as a reference point for Booth's book. It was followed by Musical Moments from Hindi Films (2006), released by Hema Malini.

In 2010 Mohammed Rafi's son Shahid Rafi launched the Mohammed Rafi Academy with Premchand as part of the academy's governing body. Two years later Premchand produced Romancing the Song (2012), a large book that plots the journey of lyrics over 80 years of cinema, in which he clarifies who really was the male voice in Kismet's "Dheere dheere aa". He wrote a third of the 2014 book Shiv Kumar Sharma: The Man and His Music, a biography of Shivkumar Sharma, alongside a piece by Pandit Vijay Kichlu.

In 2015, he released a biography of Talat Mahmood, published by Manipal University. It contains chapters written by Mahmood's daughter Sabina Talat Mahmood Rana, and son Khalid Talat Mahmood. Mahmood was a favourite of his and his mother and he stated in an interview that "my book on him was a way of saying 'Thanks Talatji, for the hundreds of hours you gave me joy ...and sometimes tears'." The following year he produced Hitting the Right Notes (2016), which reveals who blew the whistle in Kati Patang's "Ye shaam mastani". The book focusses on songwriters and composers, the difference the music made and the trends they produced.

His 2018 The Hindi Music Jukebox: Exploring Unforgettable Songs devotes one chapter to Mubarak Begum. In 2020, he released the biography of Hemant Kumar in a book titled The Unforgettable Music of Hemant Kumar. Gulzar has written the Foreword for two of Manek Premchand's books – Romancing the Song (2012) and The Unforgettable Music of Hemant Kumar (2020). In his foreword to Premchand's book Romancing the Song, Dadasaheb Phalke award winner, filmmaker-lyricist Gulzar has compared the work with Jawaharlal Nehru's The Discovery of India. For his book The Unforgettable Music of Hemant Kumar, santoor maestro Padma Vibhushan awardee Pt Shiv Kumar Sharma has called Manek Premchand the Munshi Premchand of Hindi cinema.

His book Majrooh Sultanpuri: The Poet for all Reasons on the work of the Hindi film lyricist and poet, was published in December 2021. When asked why the word Reasons instead of the generally used Seasons, the author said, "While there are only 4 seasons, there can be far many more reasons. A poet for happiness and misery, but also for hope and despair, spirituality and love, dignity and doom, the whole range of human emotions. Majrooh offers us nuances of all these and more. I felt Reasons was more apt here." The book offers clarity on the often misunderstood poetic forms of the ghazal, rubai and nazm. "There are detailed chapters on ghazals and nazms (in both of which Premchand does an excellent job of explaining the technicalities around these two forms of Urdu poetry.)" A review of the book: "...the meat of the book for those who love the world of words, is dissection, interpretation of the poetry, imagery, detailed description with reference to the scene of the film, for hundreds of songs in a number of chapters on different themes." Another review declares the book "a joy forever".

Released in January 2022, Windows to the Soul: and other essays on Music, a collection of essays on music, tells us why the tambourine cannot play sad music, presents singer Mukesh's fascination for Raag Darbari, explores the music-inspiring "popular charmer Marine Drive", and urges the I & B Ministry to posthumously confer the Bharat Ratna on composer Madan Mohan.

His book, Director's Chair: Hindi Cinema's Golden Age, was released at the Mangalore Litfest in January 2024 and is a study of the work and lives of most of the notable film directors from Hindi cinema during the 1930-1980 period. Describing the process of writing this particular book in an interview, the author said, "This book was a departure from my other work, and it was tough deciding whom to take, and whom not to...Resource matter had to be found, and old films had to be watched and rewatched. I had to make perhaps three dozen changes in virtually every para of the book to offer a sharp focus on the people who needed to be saluted." Here are some of the reviews of this book: “…do get this book: it’s not just a very good tribute to the directors who made all those films, but also, in its way, a guide to the cinema of those decades.” and “Director's Chair fills up an important gap, and is a worthwhile acquisition. You would like to browse through it again and again.” as also ‘Sui generis’, A Book in a Class of its Own’.

In 2024, he edited Shyam - A Star Forgotten, a book that outlines the journey of a Bollywood actor who died in May 1951. In early 2026, Premchand's latest Soulfully Yours, Ravi, a book on music composer Ravi, was released at an event sponsored by the Government of Bihar.

== Publications ==
=== Books ===
- Yesterday's Melodies, Today's Memories, (2003), including a guest article by MV Kamath and a foreword by Ameen Sayani
- Musical Moments from Hindi Films (2006), including Foreword by Khayyam
- Romancing the Song (2012), with a foreword by Gulzar, a Keynote by L K Advani, Curtain Raiser by Ameen Sayani and Last Word by Shivkumar Sharma
- Shiv Kumar Sharma: The Man and His Music (2014). (Contributor)
- Talat Mahmood: The Velvet Voice (2015)
- Hitting the Right Notes: Hindi Cinema's Golden Music (2016)
- The Hindi Music Jukebox: Exploring Unforgettable Songs (2018)
- Yesterday's Melodies, Today's Memories (Revised Third Edition, 2018)
- The Unforgettable Music of Hemant Kumar (2020)
- Majrooh Sultanpuri, The Poet For All Reasons (2021)
- Windows to the Soul: and other essays on Music (2022)
- Director's Chair: Hindi Cinema's Golden Age (2024)
- Shyam - A Star Forgotten (2024) (Editor)
- And The Music Lives On (2024)
- Soulfully Yours, Ravi (2025)
- The Music Hindi Cinema Forgot (2026)
