= Kotla (surname) =

Kotla is a Polish and Telugu (Telugu: కోట్ల) surname. Notable people with the surname include:

- Pavel Kotla (born 1972), Polish conductor
- Ryszard Kotla (born 1947), Polish writer and teacher
- Zdzislaw Kotla (1949–2012), Polish Olympic yachtsman
- Kotla Vijaya Bhaskara Reddy (1920–2001), Indian politician
