= Kotlas (disambiguation) =

Kotlas is a town in Arkhangelsk Oblast, Russia.

Kotlas may also refer to:

- Kotlas Urban Okrug, a municipal formation which the town of oblast significance of Kotlas in Arkhangelsk Oblast, Russia is incorporated as
- Kotlas Airport, an airport in Arkhangelsk Oblast, Russia
- MT Kotlas, a Russian product tanker

== See also ==
- Kotla (disambiguation)
- Kotlassky District, a district of Arkhangelsk Oblast, Russia
