= Florentine House in Tarnów =

Historic Renaissance building in Tarnów, Poland

- Dom Florencki w Tarnowie
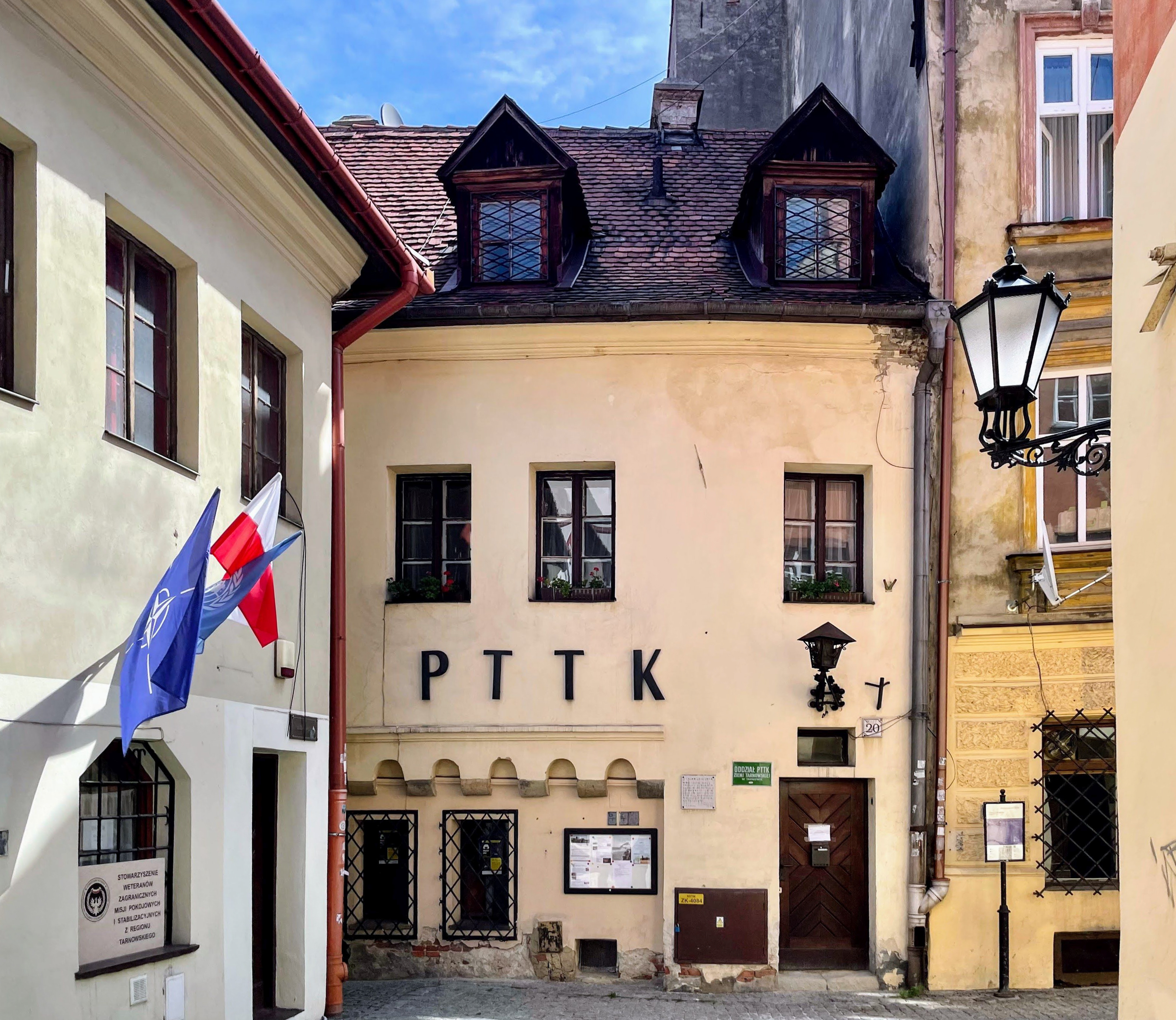
- Florentine House in Tarnów in 2022

- Location within Poland

General information
- Type: house
- Architectural style: Renaissance
- Location: Tarnów; Poland, 20 Żydowska Street
- Coordinates: 50°00′47.138″N 20°59′25.098″E
- Completed: second half of the 16th century
- Renovated: 19th century, 20th century
- Owner: Polish Tourist and Sightseeing Society

Technical details
- Grounds: 261 m^{2} (2,810 sq ft)

The Florentine House in Tarnów is a historic Renaissance building located at 20 Żydowska Street in Tarnów. It was built in the second half of the 16th century and underwent several reconstructions. Since 1960 or 1962, it has housed the Tarnów branch of the Polish Tourist and Sightseeing Society.

== Location ==
The building is situated at the intersection of Forteczna and Żydowska streets, at 20 Żydowska Street, in the eastern part of Tarnów's Old Town. It is located near the former city wall and forms the eastern terminus of Żydowska Street.

== History ==
The building known as the "Florentine House" was constructed in the second half of the 16th century. It likely originated from the merging of two separate buildings adjacent to the defensive wall. It is the oldest structure on Żydowska Street, and its name probably derives from the Italians who were present in large numbers in Tarnów during its construction, working on the restoration of the city and the castle on St. Martin's Hill.

Information about the earliest owners of the house is scarce. By the 17th century, when it was first mentioned, the property had passed into Jewish ownership. In 1814, it belonged to Majer Taubenschlag and later, before 1860, to Izaak Keller. By 1873, it was owned by Salomon Keller.

In the early 19th century, following the dismantling of the city's fortifications, the building was expanded, acquiring a second bay in place of the former moat. Remnants of the old city wall were integrated into the structure and repurposed as an interior wall. In the early 20th century, a northern avant-corps housing a staircase was added. In 1912, the property was purchased by the Vogelfang family, and in 1929, half of it was sold to co-owners Aron and Chaja Birnstein and Ida Singer. Between 1931 and 1934, the portions of the property owned by Ida Singer and the Vogelfangs were acquired by Hinda Streim.

During World War II, the building remained in the hands of its owners until 1942. After the war, it was taken over by the Municipal Building Authority and was partially inhabited. By the 1950s, the structure was in poor condition. A comprehensive renovation took place between 1954 and 1956 or 1959 and 1962, during which later additions were removed, the northern staircase was demolished, interiors were modernized, architectural details were restored, and a side entrance was created. An arched support connecting the building to a neighboring structure was also added at that time. Since 1960 or 1962, the building has housed the Tarnów Branch of the Polish Tourist and Sightseeing Society. The ground floor included a café, and a small theater called "Florentynka" operated in the building.

In 1977, the building was entered into the register of immovable monuments of the Tarnów Voivodeship (registry number A-407, dated 26 November 1977). In 1990, the Tarnów Polish Tourist and Sightseeing Society branch applied for ownership rights to the property through adverse possession, which were granted by court decision in 1993. The building's façade was renovated in 1997.

== Architecture ==
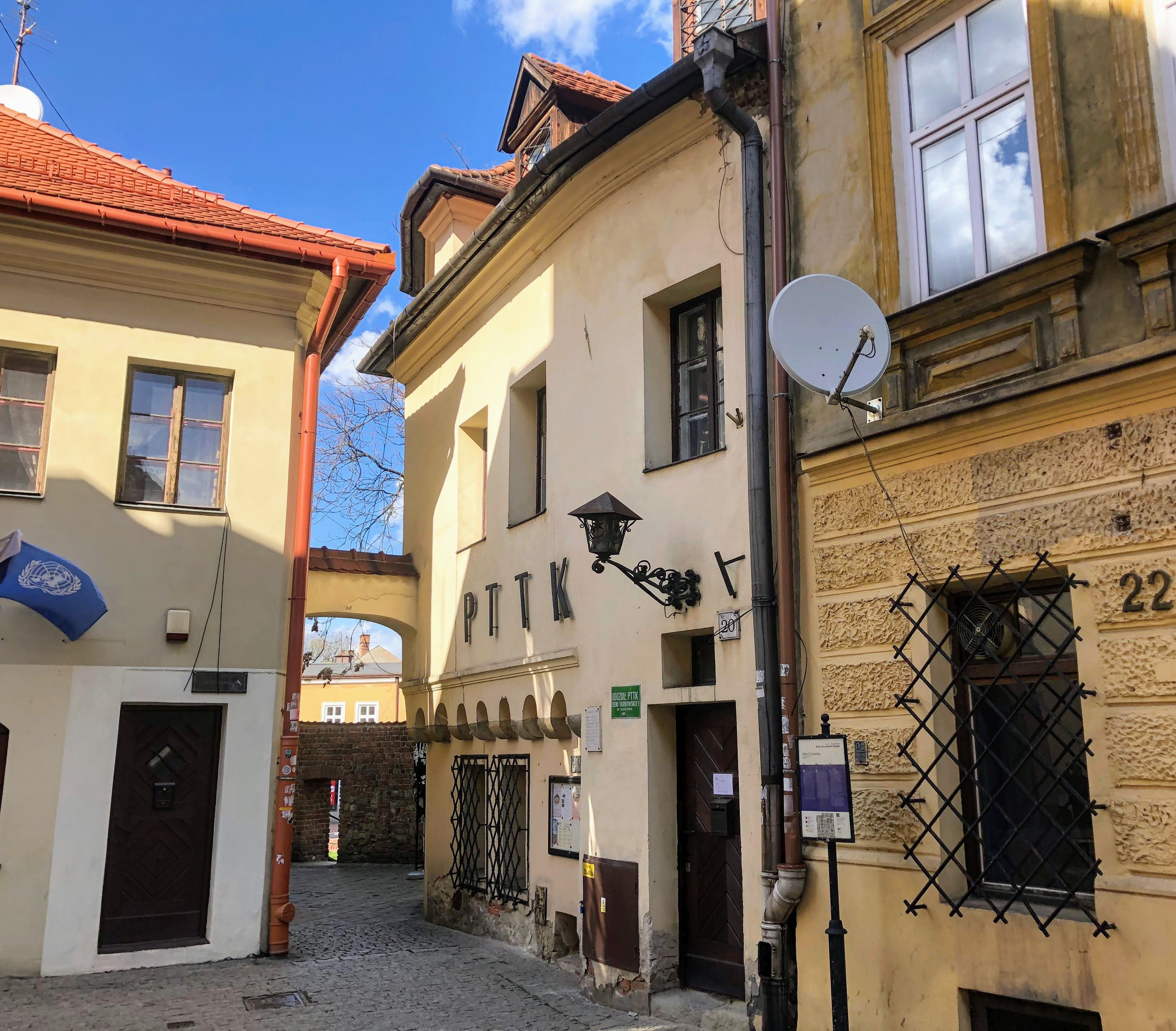
View of the building from Żydowska Street

The Florentine House is an example of Renaissance residential architecture, particularly in its oldest sections. Its defining features include the upper part of the front wall, which is overhung on corbels, and a masonry arcade connecting it to a neighboring building across the former city street.

The building is two stories with an attic and a basement. Its layout is irregular, with the interior arranged in two main bays. The foundation is made of brick and stone, using lime-sand mortar. Integrated into the building is a defensive wall, constructed with stone at the lower part and brick above. The basement walls are brick, often repaired and rebuilt, with brickwork laid in various patterns. The basement floors are paved with stone slabs and concrete. Access to the basement is via a tunnel staircase originating from the main front hall, featuring solid, two-flight stairs covered by a barrel vault. The basements under the western bay are situated at a lower level.

The walls of the building are made of solid red brick on lime-sand mortar. The interior wall plaster is lime-based, while the exterior façade uses cement-lime plaster. The front elevation is smooth and accented by a row of stone corbels and cantilevers, with small semicircular arcades between them. Above the arcades is a decorative, molded trim, and under the eaves of the roof is a cornice. The façade also features decorative hardware. The remaining walls of the building are simply plastered without special architectural details.

The door openings are rectangular, with paneled woodwork in a stylized design. They are single-leaf, mounted in chambranles. The building also contains metal doors with decorative fittings.

The front façade features small, rectangular window openings without frames, with two-leaf, double-hung, six-pane windows. The ground floor windows are protected by decorative wrought-iron grilles. In the eastern part of the building, there are larger rectangular windows, also double-leaf, double-hung, and six-paned. The attic windows in the annex are small, single-leaf, arranged in a row. The dormer windows are small but feature four panes and are either two- or three-leaf. The remaining windows in the building are rectangular and have window frames matching those on the front façade.

The floors are made of tiles or parquet. Communication between the floors is provided by a staircase with two-flight, wooden steps mounted on massive girders. The rooms on the two upper floors and in the basement have barrel vaults with lunettes, while the attic has wooden ceilings. The timber roof truss is a rafter-purlin type made of wood. The front slope has a gable roof, the northern slope is a hipped roof, and the annex has a shed roof; all are covered with ceramic tiles. Mansards with gabled roofs are located in the western part of the building.

The house has a usable floor area of 261 m² and a total volume of approximately 2,750 m³. It is equipped with central heating from the city network, as well as water, sewage, gas, and electrical installations. The property is situated on two plots of land.

== Gallery ==
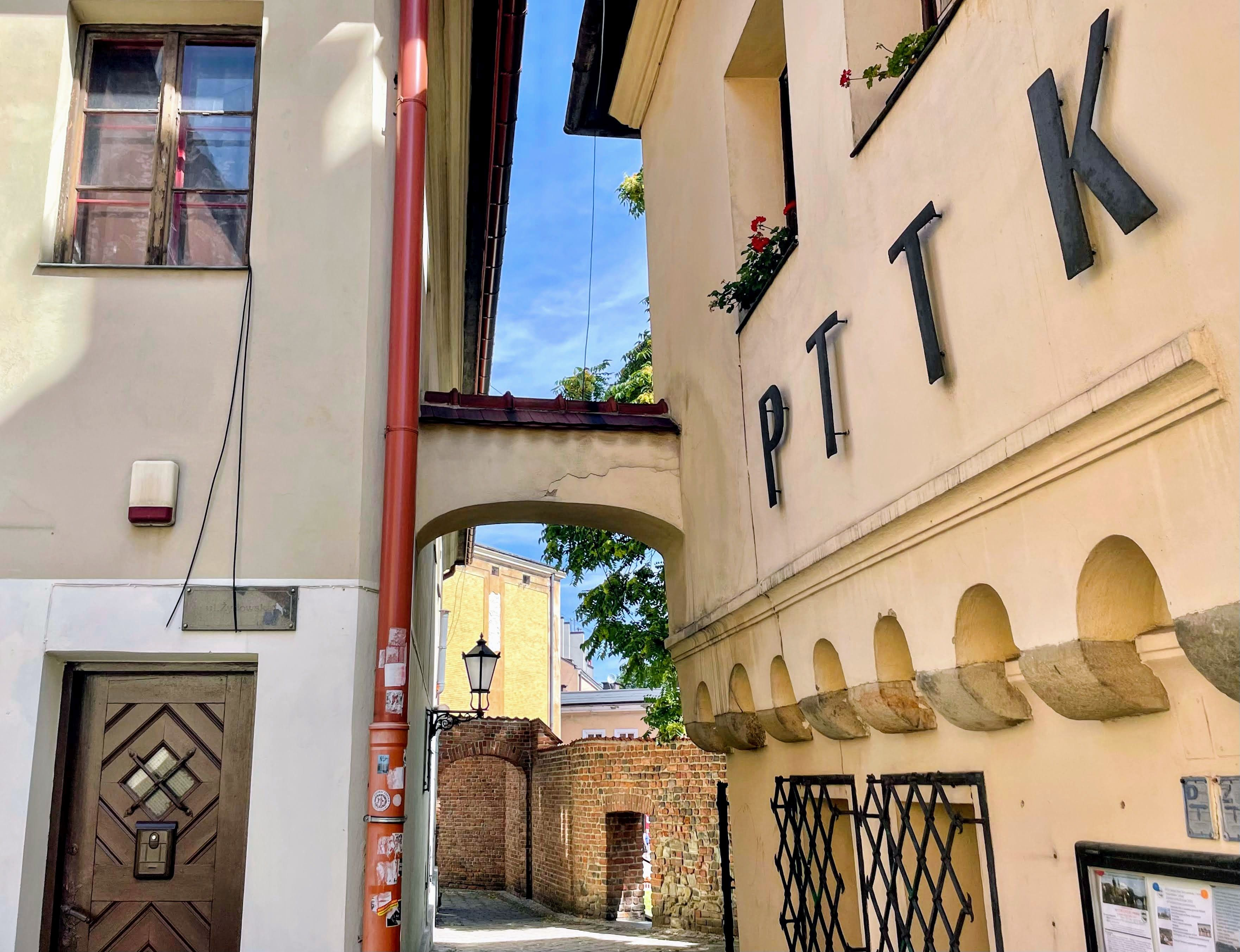
View of the corbels and the arcade connecting the Florentine House to the neighboring building

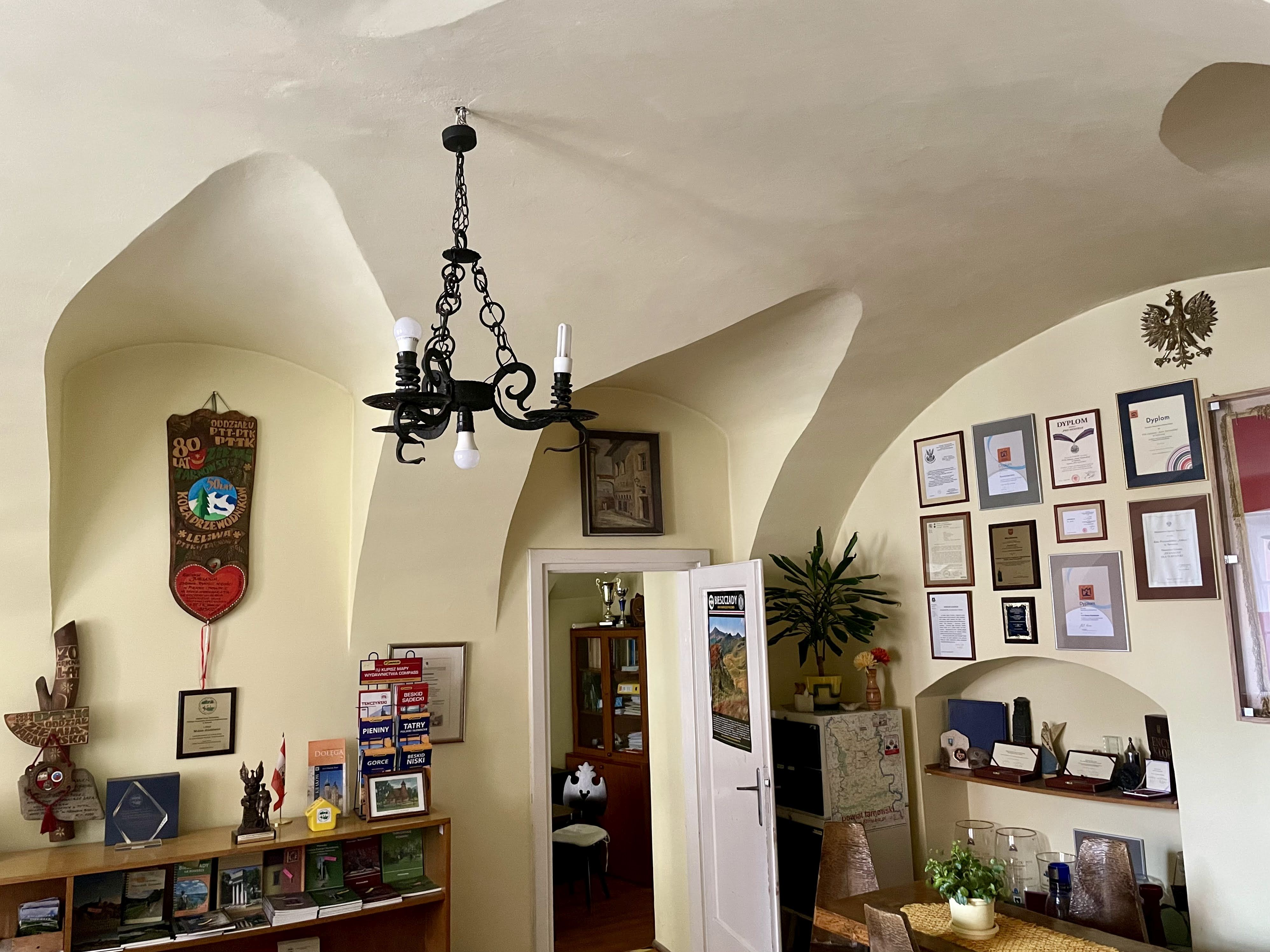
Office of the Tarnów Polish Tourist and Sightseeing Society in the Florentine House, with the preserved barrel vault visible in the room

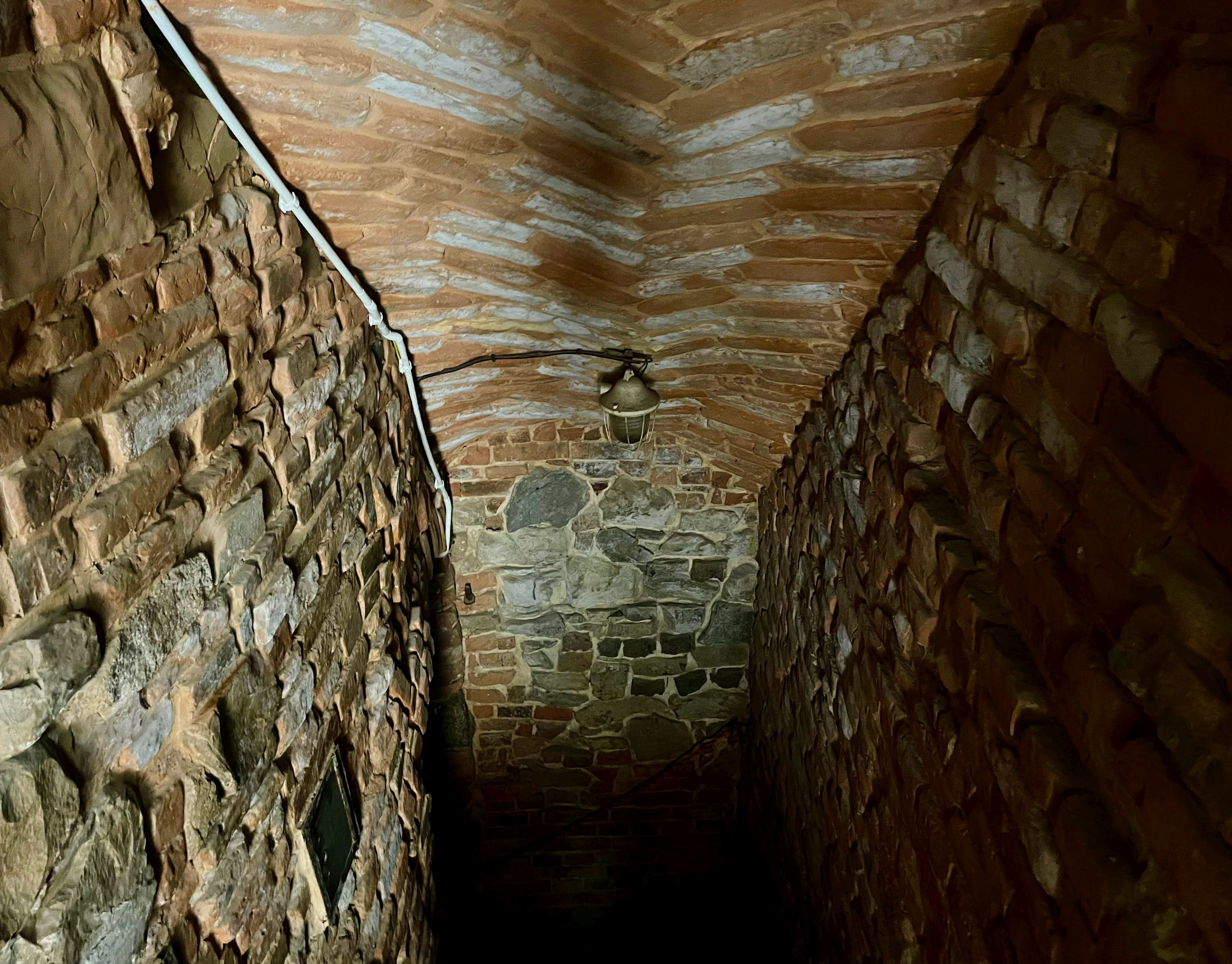
Staircase leading to the basement of the building

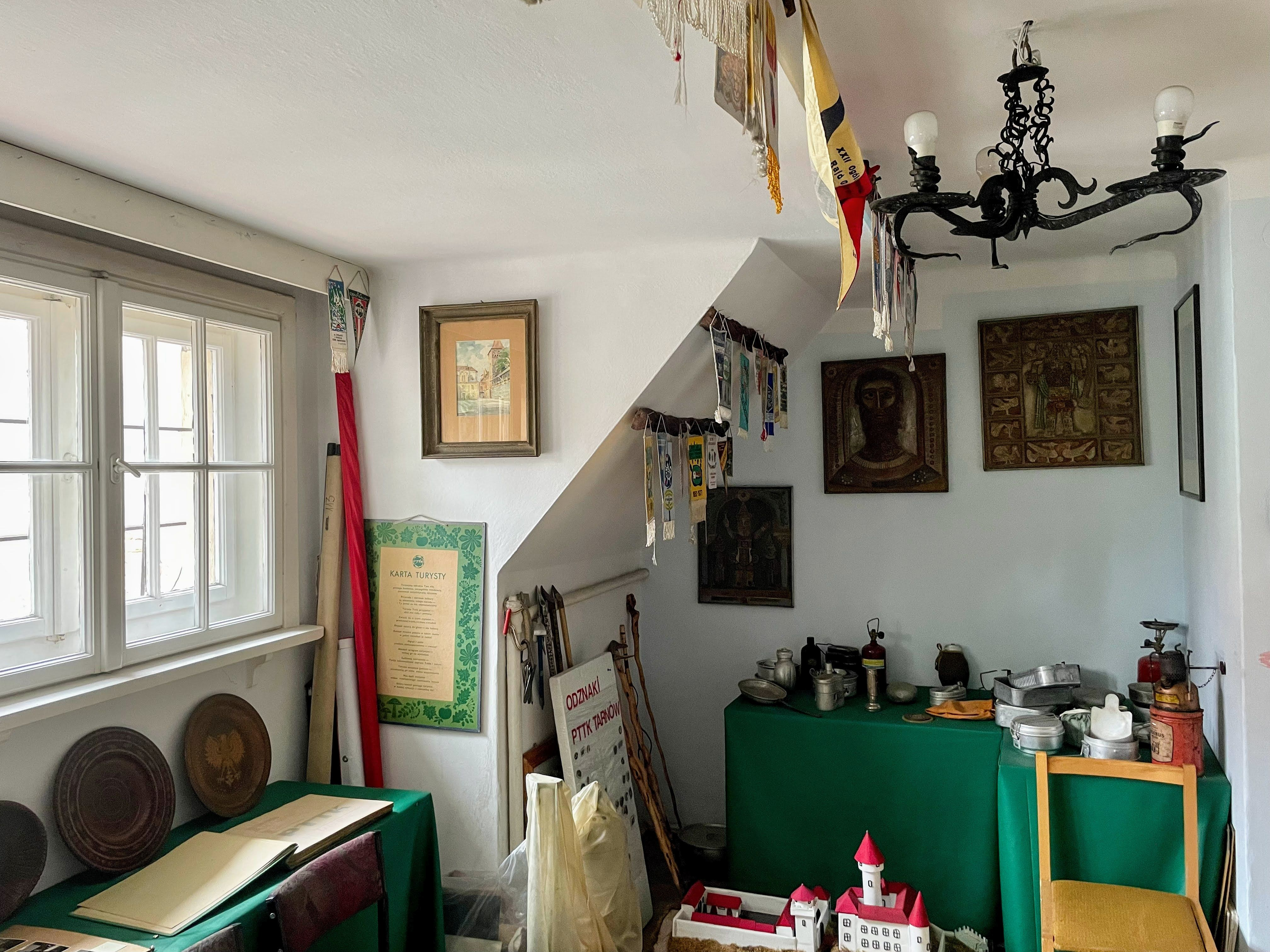
Polish Tourist and Sightseeing Society Hall of Memory located in the attic of the building

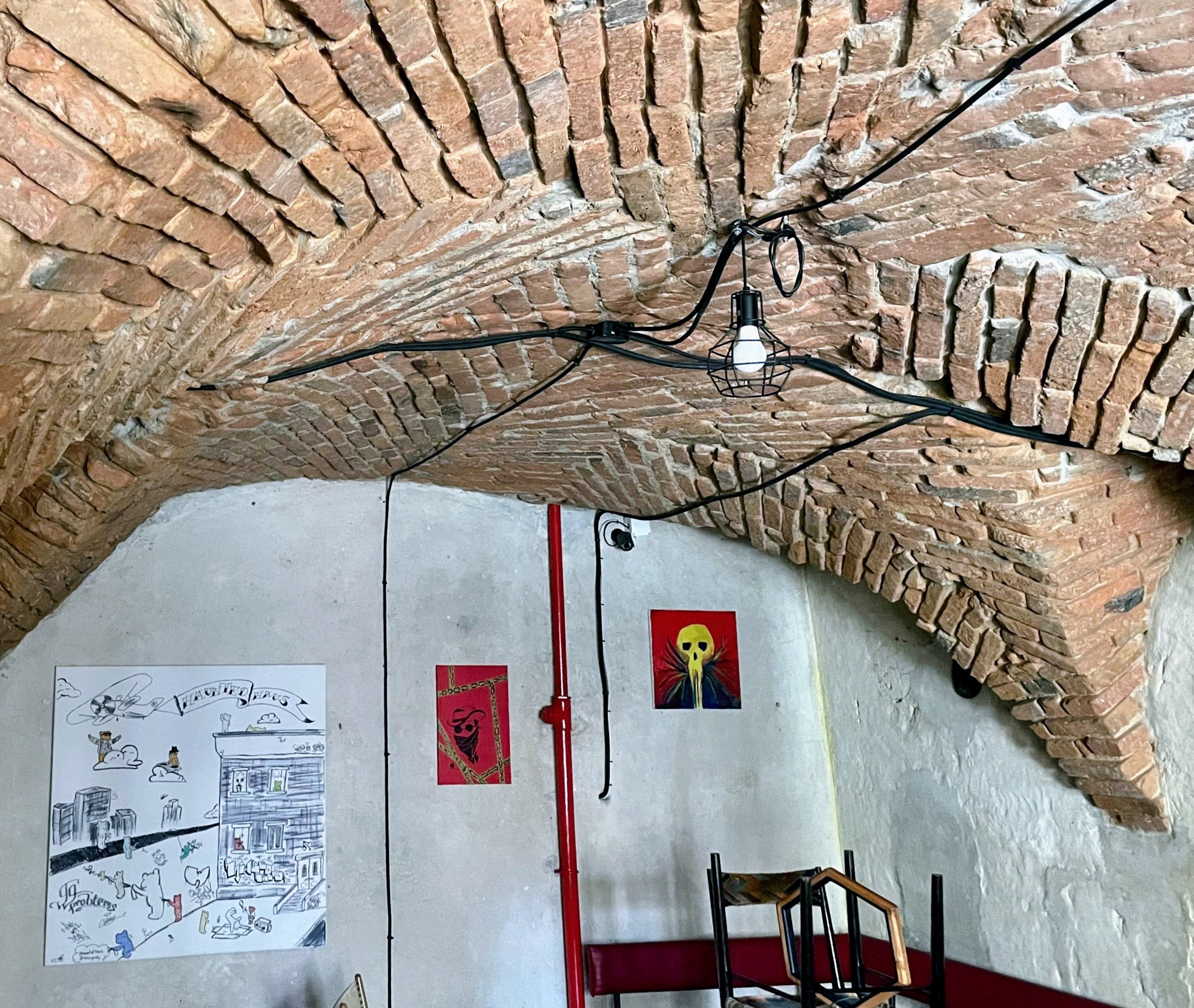
Former café space, with the preserved barrel vault visible in the room

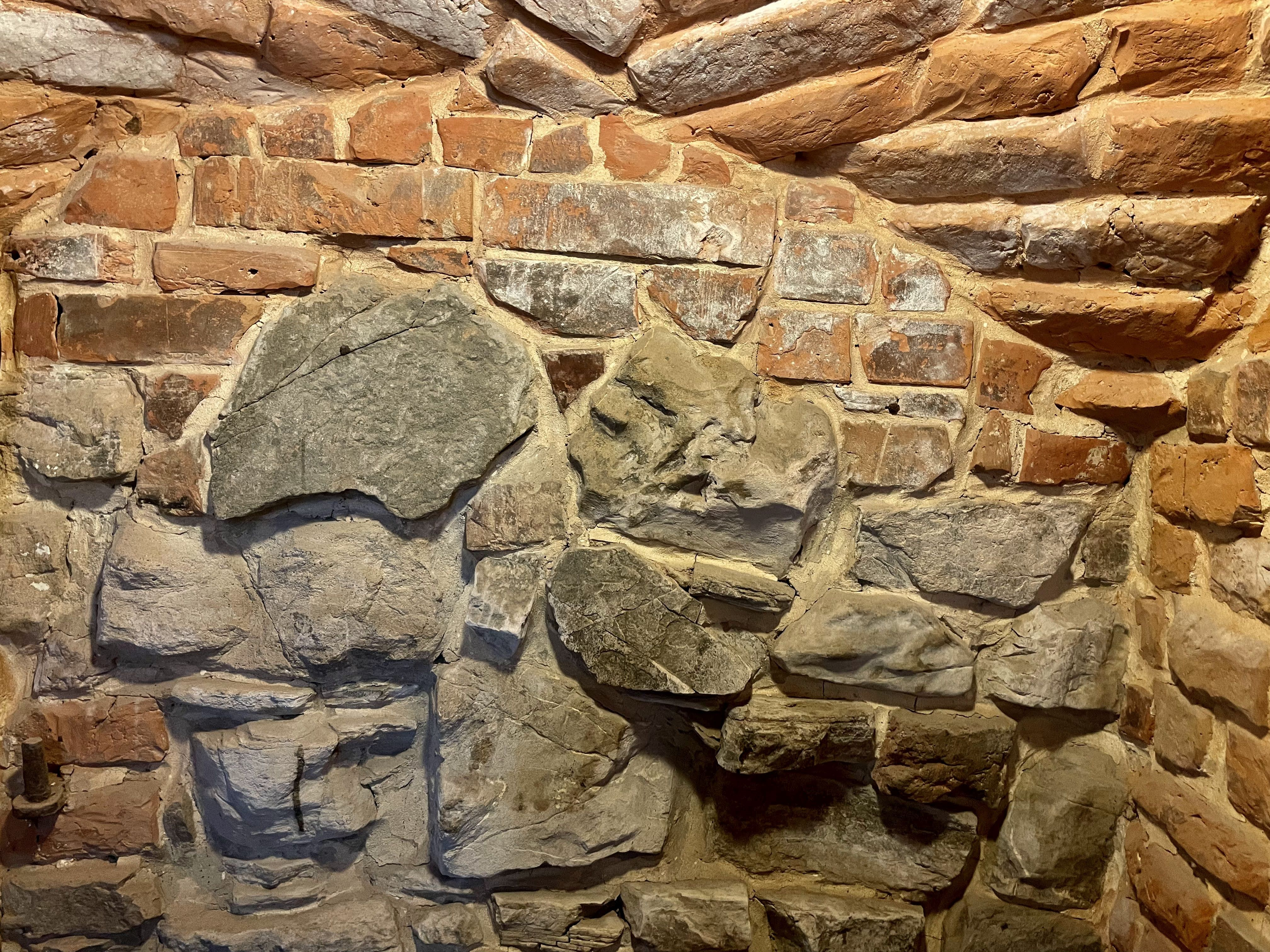
Section of the former defensive wall preserved in the basement wall of the Florentine House

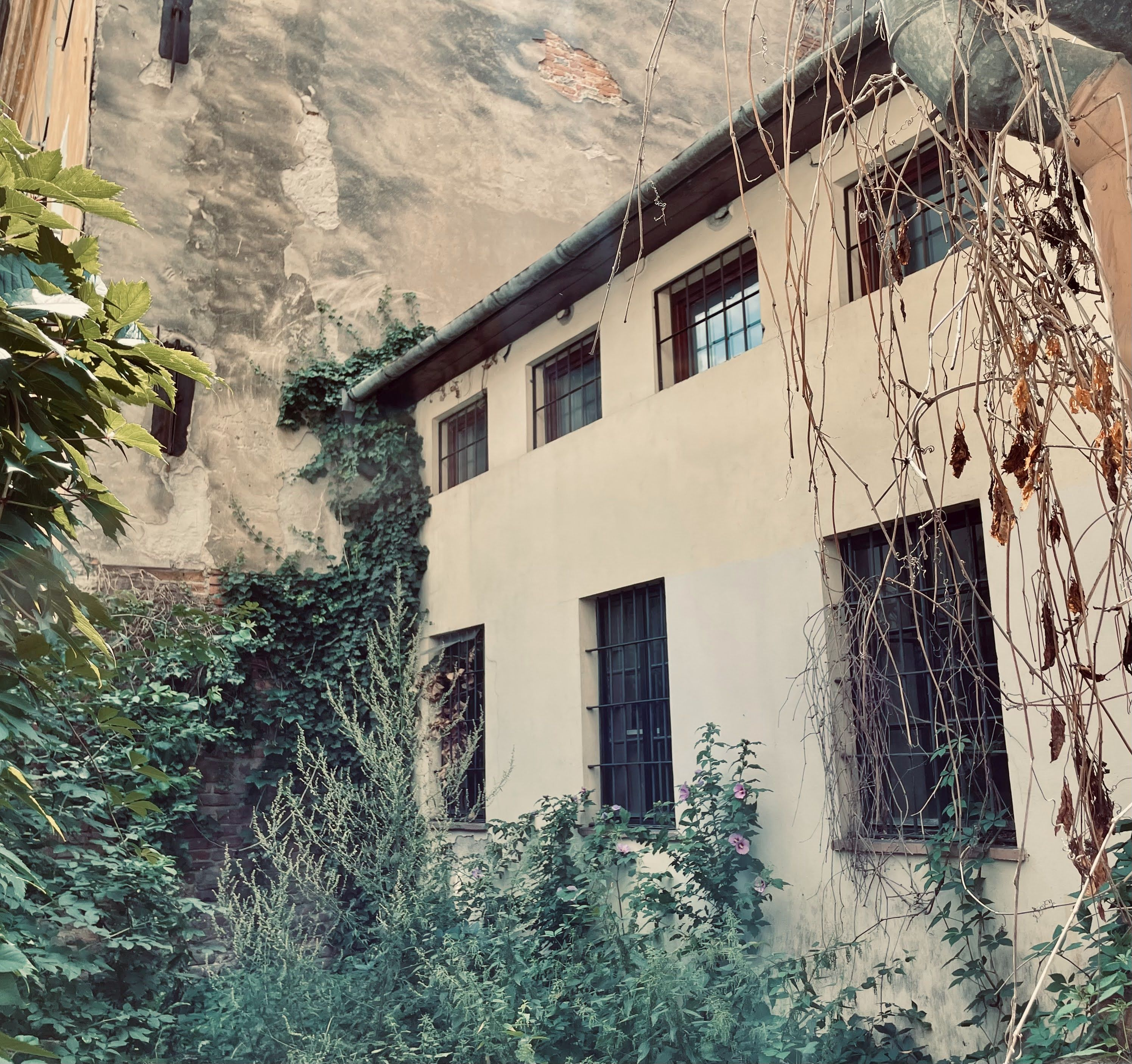
View of the building from the courtyard

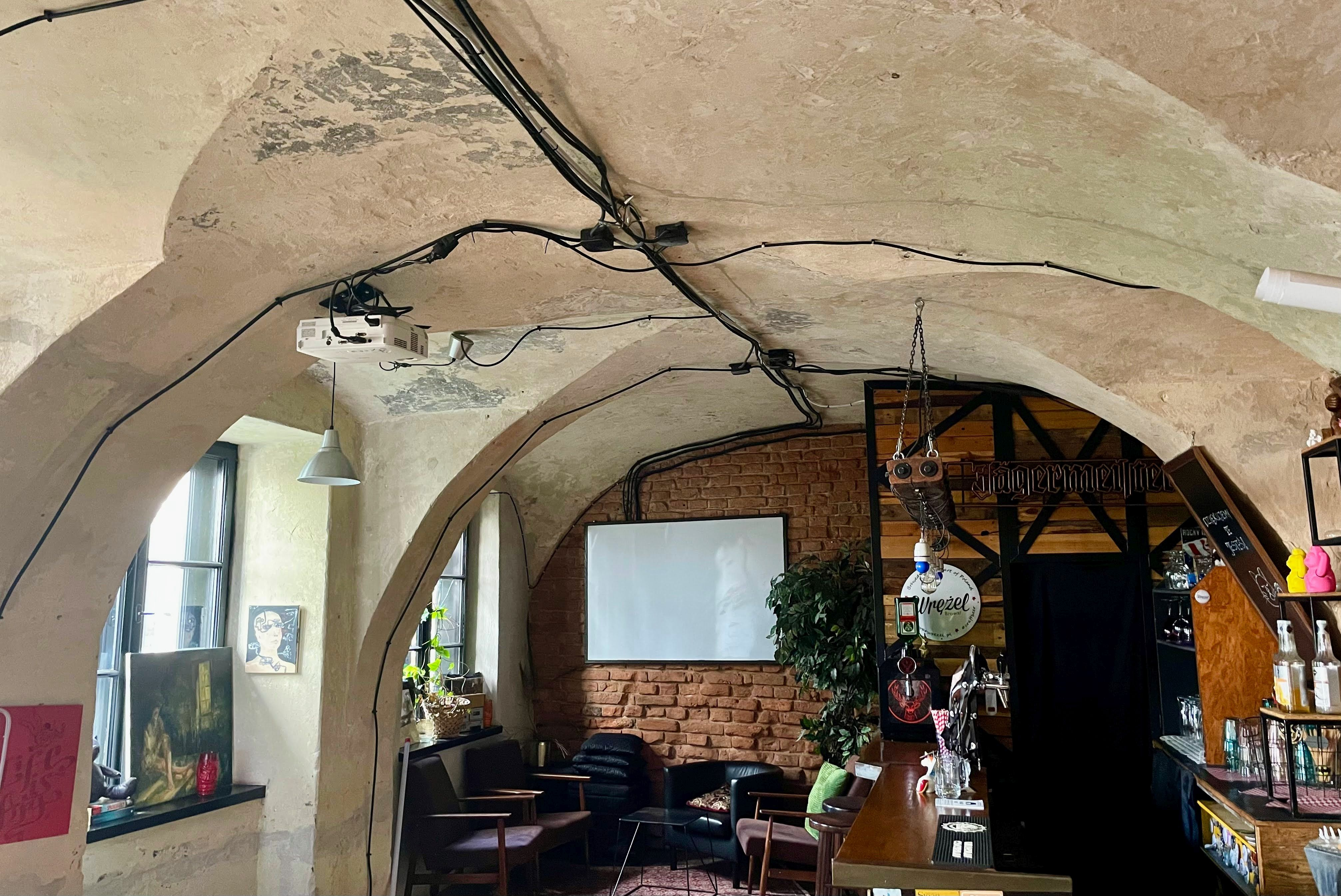
Former café space, with the preserved barrel vault visible in the room

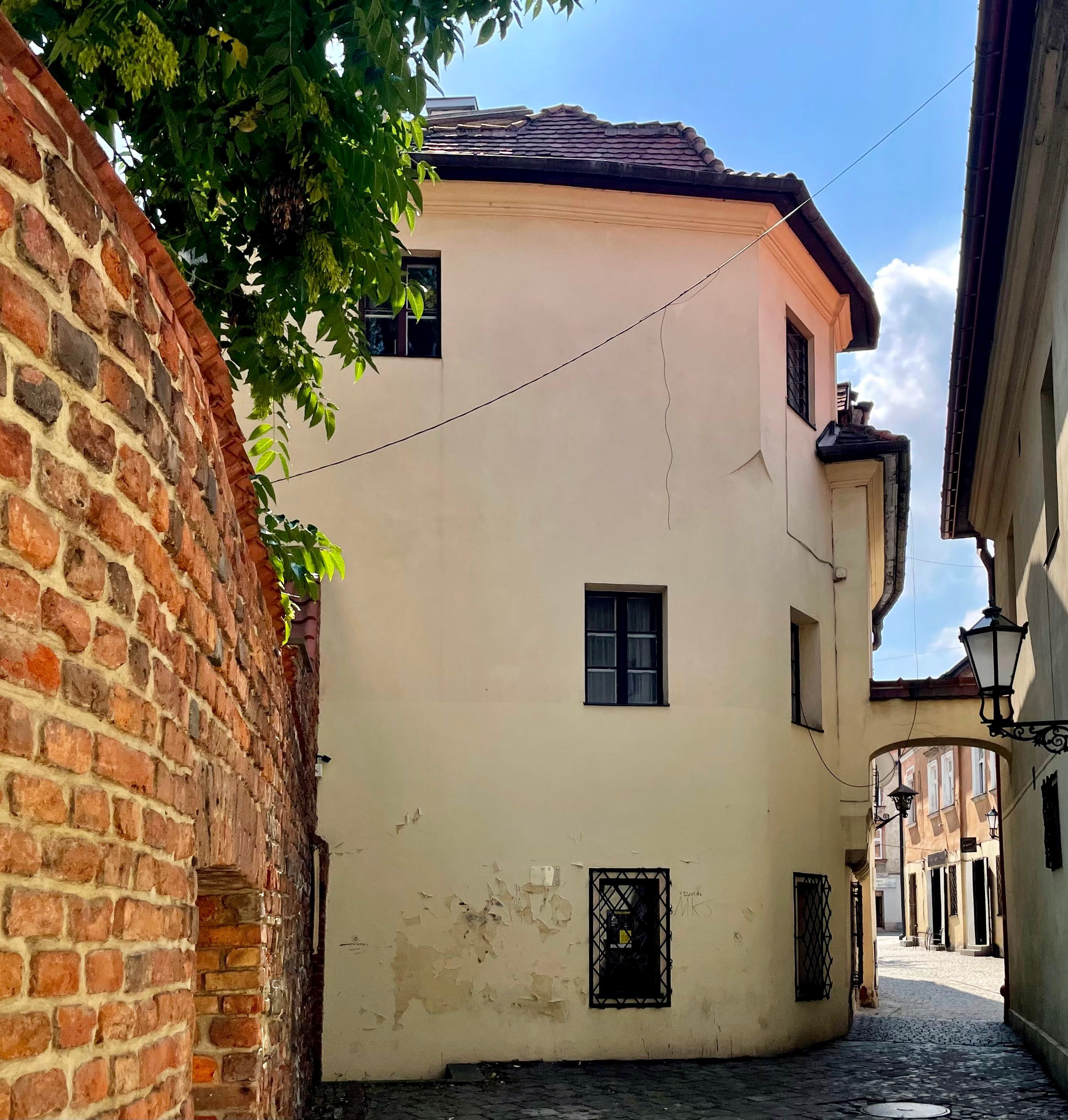
View of the building from Forteczna Street
