= Mohammed Rafi Academy =

School for music in india

- Type: Music
- Established: 31 July 2010
- Location: Mumbai, Maharashtra, India
- Campus: Urban

Mohammed Rafi Academy is a music school in Mumbai for Indian classical and contemporary music. It was launched by Shahid Rafi on 31 July 2010, the 30th death anniversary of his father and the legendary Hindi film singer, Mohammed Rafi.

== Overview ==
The Academy was launched at the hands of legendary Bollywood actor Shammi Kapoor who said he felt he lost his voice when somebody told him that Mohammed Rafi had died. A few other legends and personalities of Hindi film industry who attended the launch ceremony included Ameen Sayani, Dara Singh, Naqsh Lyallpuri, Jeetendra, Rakesh Roshan, Ravi, Pyarelal, Chandrasekhar, Anandji, Bappi Lahiri, Sanjay Khan, Salman Khan, Shah Rukh Khan, Ravindra Jain, Rishi Kapoor, Jackie Shroff, Adnan Sami Khan, Shabbir Kumar, Nitin Mukesh, Muhnish Mukesh, Amit Kumar, Udit Narayan, among others. Also present at the event were two daughters of Mohammed Rafi, viz. Nisreen and Yasmeen with their families.

The Academy is registered under Societies Registration Act of 1860 & Bombay Public Trust Act of 1950 and situated at 501, Rafi Mansion, house of Mohammed Rafi.

Apart from Shahid Rafi, son of late Mohammed Rafi, the Academy consists of Raju Naushad (Secretary), Andalib Majrooh Sultanpuri, Javed Shakeel Badayuni & Rohan Mahendra Kapoor, sons of legendary Hindi film music personalities besides Manek Premchand, Kaka JP, H.A.Makhijani, Raashid Zaffar, Shirish Kulkarni & Camaal Mustafa Sikander.
