= Leicester Symphony Orchestra =

Leicester Symphony Orchestra is based in Leicester, England. The orchestra was founded by Malcolm Sargent in 1922 along with Grace Burrows as orchestra leader. Sargent continued to conduct the orchestra until 1939. In these early years, the orchestra's prestige grew until it was able to obtain such top-flight soloists as Alfred Cortot, Artur Schnabel, Solomon, Guilhermina Suggia and Benno Moiseiwitsch.

The orchestra normally features about 80 musicians. Other conductors of the orchestra have included Arthur Thornley, Alfred de Reyghere, Harry Shaw, Simeon Iliffe, Keith Smith, Roland Melia, Nicholas Daniel, Pavel Kotla and John Andrews. The annual orchestra season includes three performances at De Montfort Hall in Leicester, and the orchestra also performs other engagements and goes on tour.
