= Colta =

Colta may refer to:

- Colta District, in Peru
- Colta Canton, in Ecuador
- Colta.ru, a Russian online publication
- Vasile Colța (born 1953), Moldovan politician

== See also ==
- Kolta (disambiguation)
