= Ryszard Kotla =

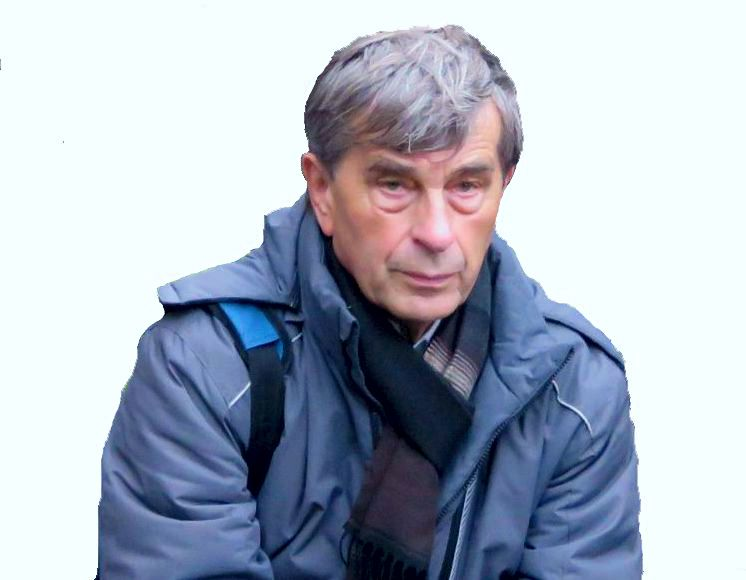
Ryszard Kotla

Ryszard Kotla (born 30 March 1947 in Szczecin, Poland) is a Polish travel writer, tour guide, activist, journalist, academic teacher and lifeguard instructor at the Polish Life Saving Association. While he is an electrical engineer by education, he is considered to be a leading expert on history and tourism in Szczecin and the greater region of Western Pomerania. He is the brother of Zdzislaw Kotla and the father of Pavel Kotla.

Kotla graduated from the Faculty of Electrical Engineering at Szczecin University of Technology (1974), post-graduated with engineering courses at Poznan University of Technology (1981) and Gdańsk University of Technology (1982), as well as studied museum and antique preservation at Wroclaw University of Technology (1990). He also studied at the French Institute of Management Studies (École Centrale Paris/Szczecin University — 1996).

He was the president of the West-Pomeranian Division and a member of the General Council of Polish Tourist-Sightseeing Society (PTTK); a member of the managing board of the West-Pomeranian Chamber of Tourism; the president of the State Examination Commission for the Tourist Guides of West Pomeranian Voivodeship; a member of the State Examination Commission for the Tour Supervisors and of the West-Pomeranian Tourist Council of West Pomeranian Voivodeship. An academic teacher at Szczecin University, Szczecin University of Agriculture, The West Pomeranian Business School, Szczecin Educational Centre; a journalist at TVP3 Szczecin and Polish Radio Szczecin; co-author of The Strategy of the Development of the West Pomeranian Voivodeship until year 2015; the author of The Opportunities for the Development of Tourism in Szczecin, The Tourist Policy in Szczecin etc.; the author of over 20 guide books, albums, folders, information leaflets about Szczecin and Western Pomerania; a member of the Polish Association of Art Historians and the Polish Association for the History of Technology.

== Publications ==
- "Spacerkiem po Szczecinie" ("Walking through Szczecin"), co-author - pub. Albatros (1991)
- "Zamek Książąt Pomorskich w Szczecinie" (Pomeranian Dukes' Castle, Szczecin) - pub. Albatros (1992)
- "Wybrzeże Bałtyku" ("The Baltic Coast"), co-author - pub. Pascal (1995)
- "Bałtyk - Pomorze" ("The Baltic - Pomerania") (in 4 languages) - pub. SAT Szczecin (1996)
- "Hanza na Pomorzu" ("Hanse in Pomerania") - pub. RAPT Szczecin (1998)
- "Życie codzienne w miastach hanzeatyckich" ("Everyday Life in Hanseatic Cities") - pub. RAPT Szczecin (1998)
- "Marianowo - przewodnik po gminie, Dzieje Sydonii Borkówny" ("Marianowo - the Guide to the Commune, the Story of Sydonia Borek")- pub. ZART (1998)
- "200 zagadek o Szczecinie" ("200 Puzzles About Szczecin"), co-author - pub. RAPT Szczecin (1998)
- The Guide "Szczecin od A do Z" ("Szczecin from A to Z") - pub. RAPT Szczecin (1999)
- "Stettin und Umgebung", ("Stettin and Surrounding Area") Laumann Druck Verlag (2000)
- The Guide "Szczecińskie ABC" ("Szczecin's ABC") - pub. ZART (2000)
- The Guide "Szczecin dla niepełnosprawnych" ("Szczecin for the Disabled") - pub. ZART (2000)
- "Szczecin – podróż nostalgiczna" ("Szczecin – the Nostalgic Journey") - pub. Publisher's (2000)
- "Bastiony, forty, bunkry... - Historia umocnień obronnych Szczecina" ("Bastions, Fortresses, Bunkers - the History of the Defences of Szczecin") – Zeszyty Szczecińskie - Zeszyt 2; pub. Publisher's (2001)
- "Atlas szlaków rowerowych Województwa Zachodniopomorskiego" ("Atlas of the Cycling Routes of the West Pomeranian Voivodeship") - pub. RAPT (2002)
- "Lange Brücke, Hansa Brücke, Most Długi... – Historia szczecińskich mostów" ("Long Bridge, Hansa Bridge, Most Długi... - the History of Szczecin's Bridges") - Zeszyty Szczecińskie – Zeszyt 6; pub. Publisher's (2002)
- "Gryfia – Stocznia na wyspie 1952 – 2002" Monografia na 50 – lecie istnienia 2002 ("Gryfia - the Shipyard on the Island 1952 - 2002," the monograph for the 50th anniversary of the shipyard) - pub. SSR "Gryfia" SA
- "Szczecin przyjazny niepełnosprawnym" ("Disabled-Friendly Szczecin") - pub. ZART (2003)

Publications by Ryszard Kotla are available at the National Library of Poland:

== Awards and distinctions ==
- Honorary Medal PTTK – gold (2003)
- Medal "For the Services to Tourist Industry" - Polish Secretariat for Sport and Tourism (1998)
- "The Pomeranian Griffon" Medal (1994)
- "The Distinguished Tourist Activist" (1992)
- State Award II Grade from the President of the Polish Secretariat for Sport and Tourism (1991)
- Meritorious Activist of Culture (1991)
- Honorary Medal PTTK - silver (1990)
- Silver Cross of Merit (1987)
- Honorary Medal of Polish Life Saving Association (1977)
- "The Distinguished Marine Industry Employee" - bronze (1972)
- Awards "For the Services to Tourist Industry" from the Polish Ministry of Trade, the General Council of PTTK, the Government of West Pomeranian Voivodeship, the Education Secretary for the West Pomeranian Voivodeship.
