= Nemeskolta =

- Location of Vas county in Hungary

- Location of Nemeskolta
- Coordinates: 47.14184°N 16.76732°E
- Country: Hungary
- County: Vas

Area
  - Total: 7.34 km^{2} (2.83 sq mi)

Population (2004)
  - Total: 368
  - Density: 50.13/km^{2} (129.8/sq mi)
- Time zone: UTC+1 (CET)
  - Summer (DST): UTC+2 (CEST)
- Postal code: 9775
- Area code: 94

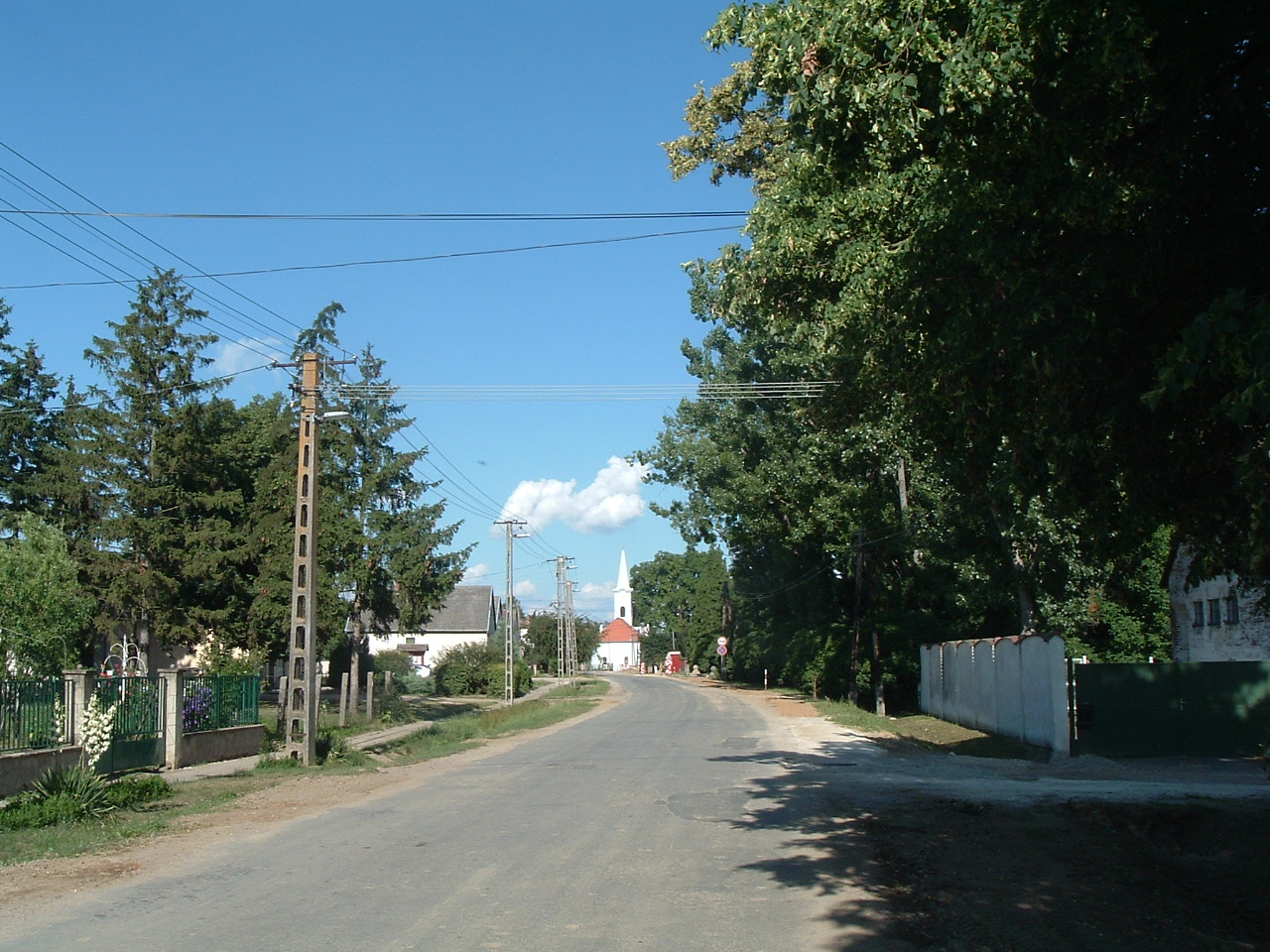
Nemeskolta, Hungary

Nemeskolta is a village in Vas county, Hungary.
