= Paweł Kotla =

Polish conductor (born 1972)

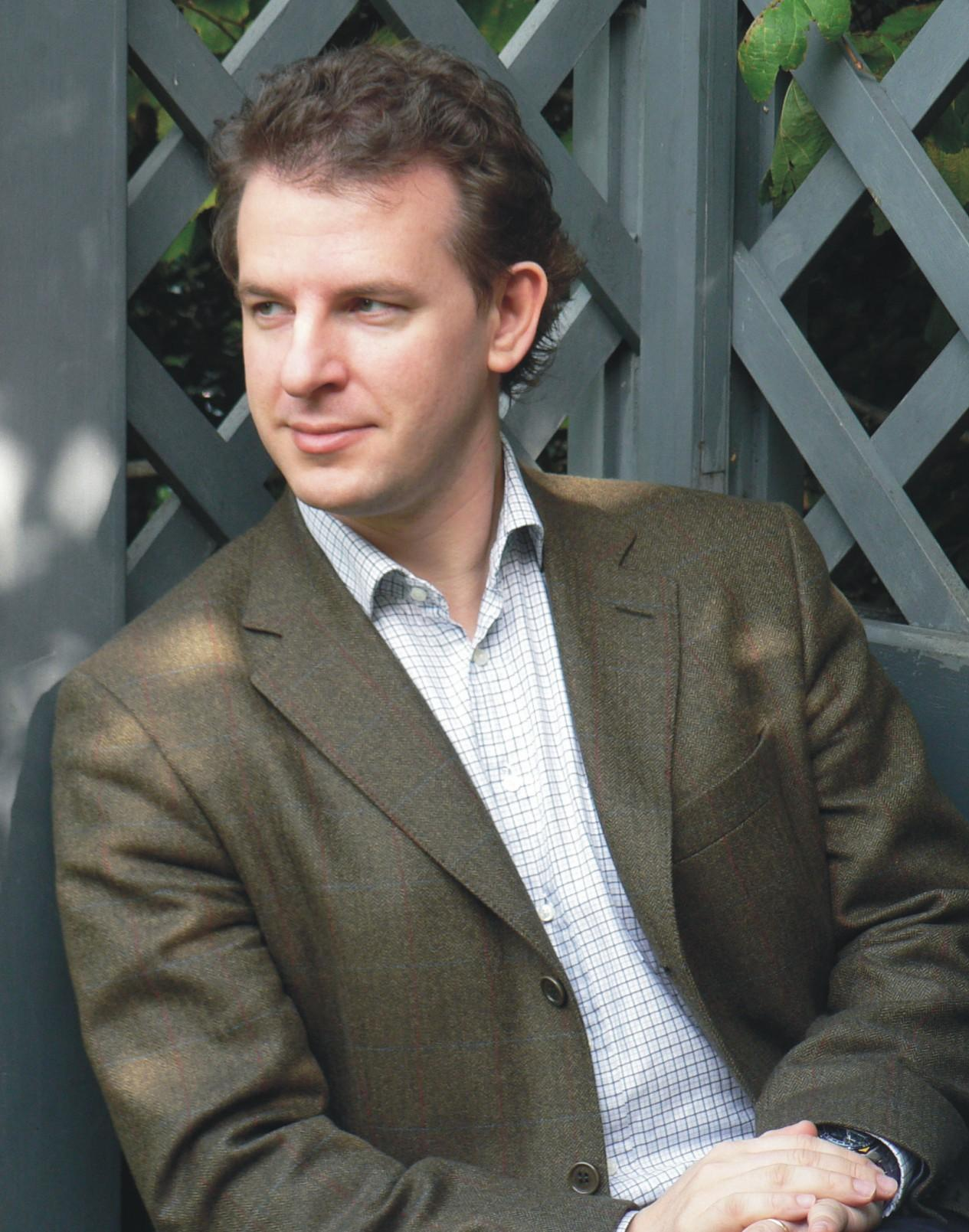
- Born: 5 June 1972 (age 54); Szczecin, Poland
- Education: Chopin Academy of Music (now: Fryderyk Chopin University of Music), Oxford University, Jagiellonian University
- Known for: Classical music

Paweł Kotla (born 5 June 1972 in Szczecin, Poland) is a Polish-British conductor, arts manager and cultural diplomacy expert. In November 2024 he was awarded by the Polish Minister of Culture and National Heritage the medal Meritorious for Polish Culture.

== Life and career ==
He was born in Szczecin, a son of Ryszard Kotla. He studied symphony and opera conducting with Boguslaw Madey at Fryderyk Chopin University of Music, musicology and performance practice with Edward Higginbottom and Andrew Parrott at Oxford University, and arts management at Jagiellonian University in Cracow.

In 1997–98, he worked as the Performing Fellow at Guildhall School of Music and Drama in London and as artistic director of Oxford University Philharmonia. From 1998 to 2003 he worked as the assistant conductor to Sir Simon Rattle; from 2001 to 2005 as the artistic director of Harpenden Choral Society; from 2005 to 2006 as the artistic director of Witold Lutosławski Symphony Orchestra of Płock (Poland); from 2004 to 2010 as the artistic director of Redhill Sinfonia; from 2006 to 2009 as the artistic director of the Leicester Symphony Orchestra; from 2008 to 2013 as a conductor of London Symphony Orchestra.

Kotla has worked with nearly all Polish professional orchestras, including Polish National Philharmonic, Polish National Radio Symphony Orchestra in Katowice, Sinfonia Varsovia, Arte dei Suonatori Baroque Orchestra, The Opera at the Castle in Szczecin and Warsaw Chamber Opera. He recorded with Polish Radio Symphony Orchestra, Baltic Neopolis Orchestra, Kalisz Philharmonic and NOSPR. He also conducted in Austria, Azerbaijan, Belarus, Belgium, Brazil, Czechia, France, Georgia, Germany, Greece, Moldova, Monaco, Russia, Slovakia, Spain, Sweden, Ukraine and the United Kingdom, working with orchestras such as London Symphony Orchestra, London Mozart Players, City of Birmingham Symphony Orchestra, Drottningholms Barockensemble, St. Petersburg Philharmonic, Monte-Carlo Philharmonic Orchestra, Orquestra Sinfonica de São Paulo, National Orchestra of Athens, Belarusian State Philharmonic, Belarusian State Chamber Orchestra, National Symphony Orchestra of Ukraine, National Philharmonic Orchestra of Moldova, Azerbaijan State Symphony Orchestra, National Chamber Orchestra of Moldova, Georgian Philharmonic, Georgian Sinfonietta and Slovak Sinfonietta.

In March 2008 he conducted the European Union Youth Orchestra in the European Parliament in Strasbourg in the historic concert celebrating 50th anniversary of the Treaty of Rome.

In 2010-2011 he was the founder and the artistic director of the largest cultural project of the Polish Presidency of the European Union 2011 - I, Culture Orchestra uniting the best young musicians from Poland and Eastern Partnership countries and performing in places like Berlin Philhamonic Hall, Berwaldhallen in Stockholm, Palais des Beaux Arts in Brussels, Royal Festival Hall in London, National Opera of Ukraine in Kyiv, Teatro Real in Madrid, and National Philharmonic Hall in Warsaw. In 2016-2017 he was the artistic director of Podlaska Opera and Philharmonic. In 2020-2021 he was the acting General and Artistic Manager of Kalisz Philharmonic.

He conducted world premieres of works by composers such as: Dariusz Przybylski, Piotr Moss, Mikołaj Górecki, Zbigniew Bagiński, Wojciech Widłak, Michał Dobrzyński, Matthew King and Christian Mason. He has also served as a juror at Polish and international music competitions.

Since 2019 he is the director of the "Beskid Classics" music festival. In 2023 he was appointed as a member of the Programming Board of Bielsko-Biała - the candidate city for European Capital of Culture 2029 title.

== Awards ==
- Medal of Polish Association of Orchestras and Choirs - bronze (2004)
- Honorable Medal of West-Pomeranian Griffin - gold (2016)
- Medal Meritorious for Polish Culture - (2024)
- Medal Global Music Awards - gold - (2026)
