= Kotla Musa Khan =

Coordinates: 29°27′N 71°22′E

کوٹلہ موسٓی خان Kotla Musa Khan
- City
- Kotla Musa
- Location of Kotla Musa Khan کوٹلہ موسٓی خان (Pakistan)
- Country: Pakistan
- Province: Punjab
- District: Bahawalpur

Area
  - Total: 2,518 km^{2} (972 sq mi)

Population
  - Total: 50,000
- Time zone: UTC+5 (PST)

Kotla Musa Khan (Earth)

Kotla Musa Khan is a city located 49 miles south of Bahawalpur District, in Punjab, Pakistan. It is 9 miles north of Ahmadpur East. The population is around 50,000. The major crops of Kotla Musa Khan are cotton, sugar cane and wheat.
