= Mohammed Rafi =

Indian playback singer (1924–1980)

- محمد رفیع
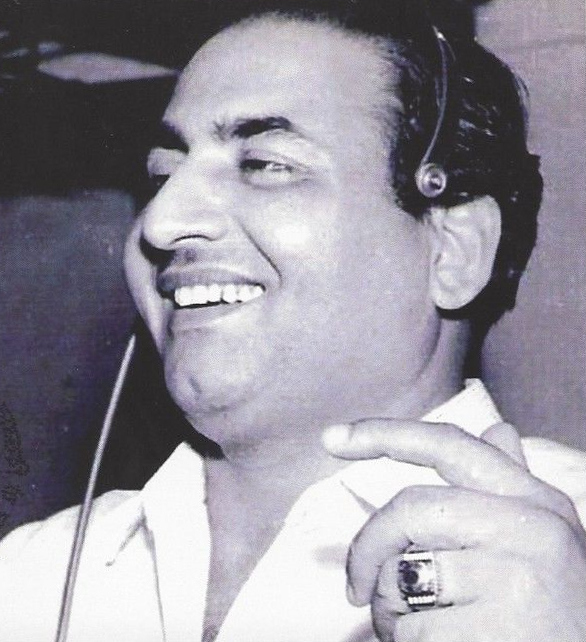
- Born: 24 December 1924; Kotla Sultan Singh, Punjab, British India (present-day Punjab, India)
- Died: 31 July 1980 (aged 55); Bombay, Maharashtra, India
- Occupation: Playback singer
- Years active: 1944–1980
- Spouses: Bashira Bibi (m. 1938–1942) Biliquis Bano (m. 1945)
- Children: 7
- Awards: Filmfare Award for Best Male Playback Singer (6 times); BFJA Best Male Playback Award; National Film Award for Best Male Playback Singer (1 time)
- Honours: Padma Shri (1967)
- Musical career
- Genres: Filmi; Bhajans; Ghazals; Qawwali; Shabad; Na'at; Classical; Nazrul Geeti; Comedy Music
- Instrument: Vocals

Mohammed Rafi (24 December 1924 – 31 July 1980) was an Indian playback singer. He is considered to have been one of the greatest and most influential singers of India. Rafi was notable for his versatility and range of voice; his songs varied from fast, peppy numbers to patriotic songs, sad numbers to highly romantic songs, qawwalis to ghazals and bhajans to classical songs. He was known for his ability to mould his voice to the persona and style of the actor lip-syncing the song on screen in the movie. He received six Filmfare Awards and one National Film Award in India. In 1967, the Government of India honored him with the fourth highest civilian award, the Padma Shri. In 2001, Rafi was honoured with the "Best Singer of the Millennium" title by Hero Honda and Stardust magazine. In 2013, Rafi was voted for the Greatest Voice in Hindi Cinema in a CNN-IBN poll.

He recorded songs for over a thousand Hindi films and in many Indian languages as well as some foreign languages, though primarily in Urdu and Punjabi, over which he had a strong command. He recorded as many as 7,000 songs throughout his career, spanning several Indian languages such as Konkani, Assamese, Bhojpuri, Odia, Bengali, Marathi, Sindhi, Kannada, Gujarati, Tamil, Telugu, Magahi, Maithili, and many more. Apart from these, he also sang in some foreign languages, including English, Persian, Arabic, Sinhala, Mauritian Creole, and Dutch.

== Early life ==
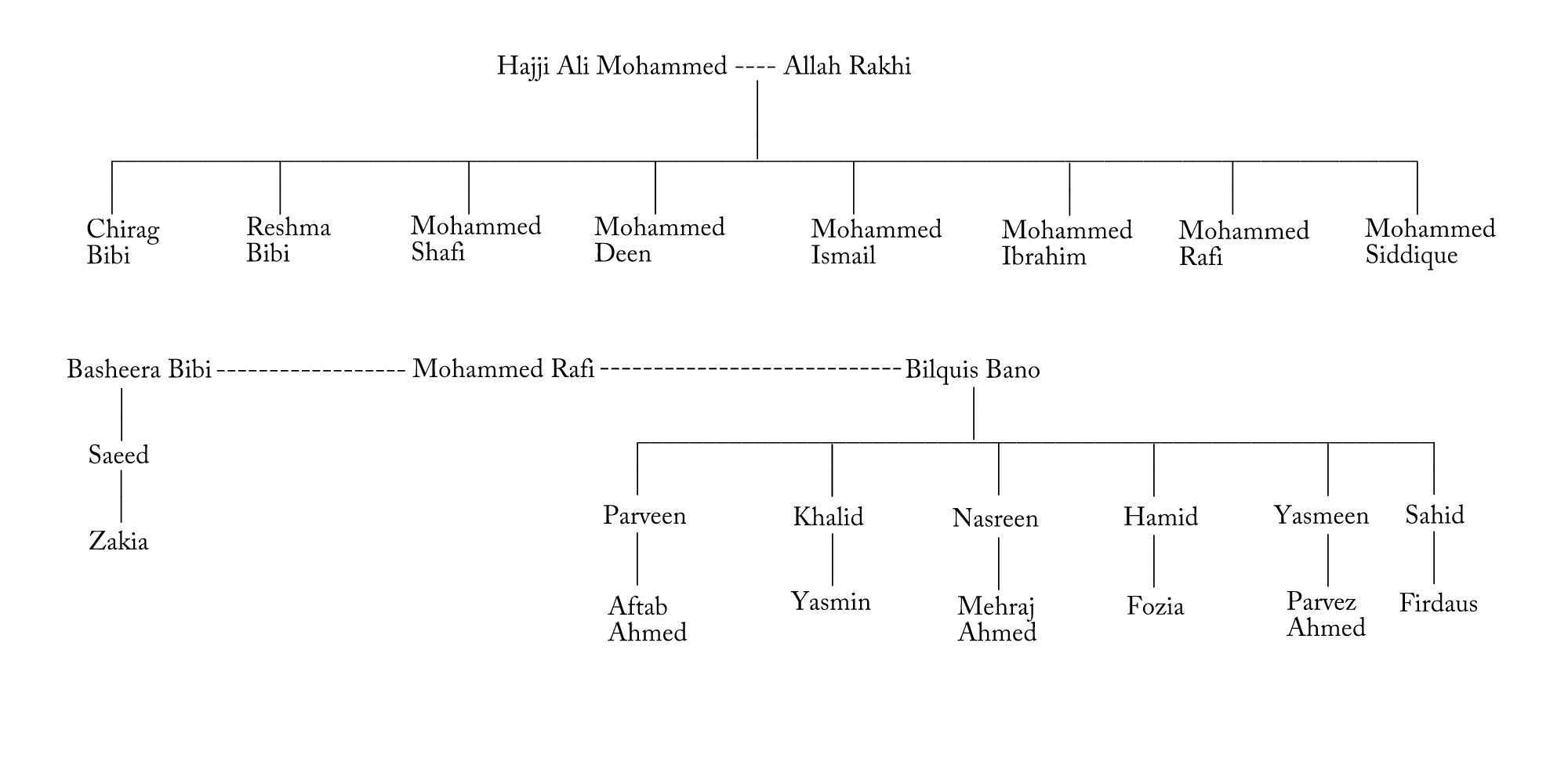
Rafi's family tree.

Mohammed Rafi was the second eldest of six brothers born to Allah Rakhi and Haji Ali Mohammad in a Punjabi Bhatti Jat Muslim family. The family originally belonged to Kotla Sultan Singh, a village near present-day Majitha in Amritsar district of Punjab, India. Rafi, whose nickname was Pheeko, began singing by imitating the chants of a fakir who roamed the streets of his native village Kotla Sultan Singh. Rafi's father moved to Lahore in 1935, where he ran a barbershop in Noor Mohalla in Bhati Gate. Rafi learnt classical music from Ustad Abdul Wahid Khan, Pandit Jiwan Lal Mattoo and Firoze Nizami. His first public performance came at the age of 13, when he sang in Lahore featuring K. L. Saigal. In 1941, Rafi made his debut in Lahore as a playback singer in the duet "Goriye Nee, Heeriye Nee" with Zeenat Begum in the Punjabi film Gul Baloch (released in 1944) under music director Shyam Sunder. In that same year, Rafi was invited by All India Radio Lahore station to sing for them.

== Early career in Bombay ==
Rafi moved to Bombay (now Mumbai), Maharashtra in 1944. He and Hameed Sahab rented a ten-by-ten-feet room in the crowded downtown Bhendi Bazar area. Poet Tanvir Naqvi introduced him to film producers including Abdur Rashid Kardar, Mehboob Khan and actor-director Nazeer. Shyam Sunder was in Bombay and provided the opportunity to Rafi to sing a duet with G. M. Durrani, "Aji dil ho kaabu mein to dildar ki aisi taisi...," for Gaon Ki Gori, which became Rafi's first recorded song in a Hindi film. Other songs followed.

Rafi's first song with Naushad was "Hindustan Ke Hum Hain" with Shyam Kumar, Alauddin and others, from A. R. Kardar's Pehle Aap (1944).

Rafi appeared in two movies. He appeared on the screen for the songs "Tera Jalwa Jis Ne Dekha" in film Laila Majnu (1945) and "Woh Apni Yaad Dilane Ko" in the Film Jugnu (1947). He sang a number of songs for Naushad as part of the chorus, including "Mere Sapnon Ki Rani, Roohi Roohi" with K. L. Saigal, from the film Shahjahan (1946). Rafi sang "Tera Khilona Toota Balak" from Mehboob Khan's Anmol Ghadi (1946) and a duet with Noor Jehan in the 1947 film Jugnu, "Yahan Badla Wafa Ka". After partition, Rafi decided to stay back in India and had the rest of his family flown to Bombay. Noor Jehan migrated to Pakistan and made a pair with playback singer Ahmed Rushdi.

In 1949, Rafi was given solo songs by music directors such as Naushad (Chandni Raat, Dillagi and Dulari), Shyam Sunder (Bazaar) and Husnalal Bhagatram (Meena Bazaar).

Besides K. L. Saigal, whom he considered his favorite, Rafi was also influenced by G. M. Durrani. In the early phase of his career, he often followed Durrani's style of singing, but later evolved his own, unique style. He sang with Durrani in some of the songs such as "Humko Hanste Dekh Zamana Jalta Hai" and "Khabar Kisi Ko Nahiin, Woh Kidhar Dekhte" (Beqasoor, 1950).

In 1948, after the assassination of Mahatma Gandhi, the team of Husanlal Bhagatram-Rajendra Krishan-Rafi had overnight created the song "Suno Suno Ae Duniyawalon, Bapuji Ki Amar Kahani". He was invited by the Indian Prime Minister, Jawaharlal Nehru, to sing at his house. In 1948, Rafi received a silver medal from Jawaharlal Nehru on Indian Independence Day.

== Recording career in the 1950s and 1960s ==
In his early career, Rafi associated with many contemporary music directors, most notably Naushad Ali. In the late 1950s and 1960s, he worked with other composers of the era such as O. P. Nayyar, Shankar Jaikishan, S.D. Burman and Roshan.

=== Work with Naushad ===
As per Naushad, Rafi came to him with a letter of recommendation from Naushad's father. Rafi's first song for Naushad Ali was "Hindustan Ke Hum Hain" ("We belong to Hindustan") for the film Pehle Aap in 1944. The first song for the duo was the soundtrack of the movie Anmol Ghadi (1946).

Rafi's association with Naushad helped the former establish himself as one of the most prominent playback singers in Hindi cinema. Songs from Baiju Bawra (1952) like "O duniya ke rakhwale" and "Man tarpat hari darshan ko aaj" furthered Rafi's credentials. Rafi ended up singing a total of 149 songs (81 of them solo) for Naushad. Before Rafi, Naushad's favorite singer was Talat Mahmood. Once Naushad found Talat smoking during a recording. He was annoyed and hired Rafi to sing all the songs of the movie Baiju Bawra.

=== Work with S. D. Burman ===
S. D. Burman used Rafi as a singing voice of Dev Anand and Guru Dutt. Rafi worked with Burman in 37 films, including Pyaasa (1957), Kaagaz Ke Phool (1959), Kala Bazar (1960), Nau Do Gyarah (1957), Kala Pani (1958), Tere Ghar Ke Saamne (1963), Guide (1965), Aradhana (1969), Ishq Par Zor Nahin (1970) and Abhimaan (1973).

=== Work with Shankar–Jaikishan ===
Rafi's partnership with Shankar–Jaikishan was among the most famous and successful in the Hindi film industry. He worked with them from their first film, Barsaat (1949). Under Shankar–Jaikishan, Rafi produced some of his songs for actors like Shammi Kapoor and Rajendra Kumar. Out of six Filmfare awards, Rafi won three for S-J songs – "Teri Pyaari Pyaari Surat Ko", "Bahaaron Phool Barsaao" and "Dil Ke Jharokhe Mein." The song "Yahoo! Chaahe Koi Mujhe Junglee Kahe" was sung by Rafi, matched by a fast-paced orchestra and composition by Shankar Jaikishan. S-J had Rafi give playback for Kishore Kumar in the film Sharaarat ("Ajab Hai Daastaan Teri Ye Zindagi"). Rafi sang a total of 341 numbers—216 solo—for Shankar–Jaikishan. Among the films of this combination are: Awaara, Boot Polish, Basant Bahar, Professor, Junglee, Asli-Naqli, Rajkumar, Suraj, Sangam, Brahmachari, Arzoo, An Evening in Paris, Dil Tera Deewana, Yakeen, Prince, Love in Tokyo, Beti Bete, Dil Ek Mandir, Dil Apna Aur Preet Parai, Gaban and Jab Pyar Kisi Se Hota Hai.

=== Work with Ravi ===
Rafi got his first Filmfare Award for the title song of Chaudhvin Ka Chand (1960), composed by Ravi. He received the National Award for the song "Baabul Ki Duaen Leti Jaa" from the film Neel Kamal (1968), also composed by Ravi. Rafi wept during the recording of this song, which he admitted in a 1977 interview with the BBC.

Ravi and Rafi produced several other songs in the films China Town (1962), Kaajal (1965), Do Badan (1966) and Ek Phool Do Maali (1969)

=== Work with Madan Mohan ===
Madan Mohan was another composer whose favorite singer was Rafi. Rafi's first solo with Madan Mohan in Aankhen (1950) was "Hum Ishk Mein Burbaad Hein Burbaad Ruhenge". They teamed up to produce many songs including "Teree Aankhon Ke Sivaa", "Yeh Duniyaa Yeh Mehfil", "Tum Jo Mil Guye Ho", "Kur Chale Hum Fida", "Meree Aawaaz Suno" and "Aap Ke Pehlu Mein Aakur".

=== Work with O. P. Nayyar ===
Rafi and O. P. Nayyar (OP) created music in the 1950s and 1960s. O. P. Nayyar was once quoted as saying "If there had been no Mohammed Rafi, there would have been no O. P. Nayyar".

He and Rafi created many songs together including "Yeh Hai Bombay Meri Jaan". He got Rafi to sing for singer-actor Kishore Kumar – "Man Mora Baawara" for the movie Raagini. Later, Rafi sang for Kishore Kumar in movies such as Baaghi, Shehzaada and Shararat. O. P. Nayyar used Rafi and Asha Bhosle for most of his songs. The team created many songs in the early 1950s and 1960s for movies such as Naya Daur (1957), Tumsa Nahin Dekha (1957), Ek Musafir Ek Hasina (1962) and Kashmir Ki Kali (1964). Rafi sang a total of 197 numbers (56 solo) for Nayyar. The songs "Jawaaniyan yeh mast mast" and the title song "Yun to humne lakh hansee dekhe hain, tumsa nahin dekha" of the film Tumsa Nahin Dekha were hits. They were followed by songs like "Yeh Chand Sa Roshan Chehera" from Kashmir ki Kali.

Rafi and OP had a falling-out during the recording for movie "Sawan ki Ghata". As disclosed by OP during one of his interviews; Rafi reported late to the recording stating that he was stuck in Shankar Jaikishan's recording. OP then stated that from now on he too did not have the time for Rafi and cancelled the recording. They did not work together for the next 3 years.

=== Work with Laxmikant-Pyarelal ===
The composer duo Laxmikant–Pyarelal (L-P) patronized Rafi as one of their singers, right from their first song by him from the film Parasmani (1963). Rafi and L-P won the Filmfare Award for the song "Chaahoonga Mein Tujhe Saanjh Suvere" from Dosti (1964). Rafi rendered the highest number of songs for this music director duo Laxmikant-Pyarelal, as compared to all the music directors: 388.

Once, when composer Nisar Bazmi, who once worked with Laxmikant-Pyarelal before he had migrated to Pakistan, didn't have enough money to pay him, Rafi charged a fee of one rupee and sang for him. He also helped producers financially. As Laxmikant once observed – "He always gave without thinking of the returns".

=== Work with Kalyanji Anandji ===
Kalyanji Anandji composed around 170 songs in the voice of Rafi. Kalyanji's relationship with Rafi started with the 1958 film, Samrat Chandragupta, his debut film as a solo composer. Kalyani-Anandji and Rafi went on to work together for the music of the Shashi Kapoor-starrer Haseena Maan Jayegi (1968), which featured songs like "Bekhudi Mein Sanam" and "Chale The Saath Milke".

=== Work with contemporary singers ===
Rafi associated with several of his contemporaries, singing duets with them and sometimes for them (as in case of Kishore Kumar who was also an actor). Rafi sang the highest number of duets with Asha Bhosle (female), Manna Dey (male) and Lata Mangeshkar (female).

Rafi's duets with Suman Kalyanpur (female) are also notable. They sang over 140 duets and many of them are popular even today. These duets include "Aaj-Kal Tere-Mere Pyar ke Charche" from Brahmachari (1968), "Tumne Pukara aur hum Chale Aaye" from Rajkumar (1964) and so on.

In the song "Humko Tumse Ho Gaya Hai Pyaar" (Amar Akbar Anthony), Rafi sang one song with Kishore Kumar, Lata Mangeshkar, and Mukesh, the most legendary singers in Bollywood. This was probably the only time that all of them rendered their voices for one song.

=== Work with other music directors ===
Rafi sang frequently for all music directors during his lifetime, including C. Ramchandra, Roshan, Jaidev, Khayyam, Rajesh Roshan, Ravindra Jain, Bappi Lahiri, Sapan Jagmohan, T.V.Raju, S.Hanumantha Rao etc. He had a special and major association with Usha Khanna, Sonik Omi, Chitragupta, S.N. Tripathi, N. Datta and R.D. Burman. He also sang for many small time and lesser-known music directors. Many for whom he sang for free while making their compositions immortal; he selflessly believed in financially assisting producers and helping small-time projects who could not afford much. Many in the industry received regular financial help from Rafi.

=== Private albums ===
Rafi sang several songs in Chris Perry's Konkani album Golden Hits with Lorna Cordeiro. He recorded many private albums in various genres and languages. Rafi recorded Hindi songs in English on 7" release in 1968. He also sang 2 songs in Mauritian Creole while on his visit to Mauritius in the late 1960s.

=== Royalty issue ===
In 1962–1963, the popular female playback singer Lata Mangeshkar raised the issue of playback singers' share in the royalties. Recognizing Rafi's position as the leading male playback singer, she wanted him to back her in demanding a half-share from the 5% song royalty that the film's producer conceded to select composers. Rafi refused to side with her, stating that his claim on the film producer's money ended with his being paid his agreed fee for the song. Rafi argued that the producer takes financial risk and the composer creates the song, so the singer does not have any claim over the royalty money. Lata viewed his stand as a stumbling block on the royalty issue and stated that it is because of the singer's name also that the records get sold. This difference of opinion subsequently led to differences between the two. During the recording of "Tasveer Teri Dil Mein" (Maya, 1961), Lata argued with Rafi over a certain passage of the song. Rafi felt belittled, as music director Salil Chowdhury sided with Lata. The situation worsened when Lata declared that she would no longer sing with Rafi. Rafi stated that he was only so keen to sing with Lata as she was with him. The music director Jaikishan later negotiated a reconciliation between the two. In an interview given to The Times of India on 25 September 2012, Lata claimed to have received a written apology from Rafi. However, Shahid Rafi, Mohammad Rafi's son, rebuffs the claim, calling it an act to dishonour his father's reputation.

== Early 1970s ==
In the 1970s, Rafi suffered from a throat infection for an extended period of time. During a brief period then, he recorded fewer songs. Although his musical output was relatively low during this period, Rafi did sing some of his best and most popular numbers then, such as "Yeh Duniya Yeh Mehfil", "Gulabi Aankhen", "Jhilmil Sitaron Ka Aangan Hoga", "Koi Nazrana Lekar Aaya Hu", "Aaya Re Khilonewala", "Tum Mujhe Yun Bhula Na Paaoge", "Re Mama Re Mama Re", "Nafrat Ki Duniya Ko", "Ye Jo Chilman Hai", "Kuchh Kehta Hai Ye Saawan", "Kitna Pyaara Wada", "Chalo Dildaar Chalo", "Aaj Mausam Bada Be-Imaan Hai", "Chura Liya Hai Tumne", "Yaadon Ki Baaraat Nikli Hai Aaj Dil Ke Dwaare", "Teri Bindiya Re", to name a few.

== Later years ==
Rafi made a comeback as a leading singer in mid 1970s. In 1974 he won the Film World magazine Best Singer Award for the song "Teri Galiyon Mein Na Rakhenge Kadam Aaj Ke Baad" (Hawas, 1974) composed by Usha Khanna.

In 1976, Rafi sang all the songs for Rishi Kapoor in the blockbuster film Laila Majnu. Rafi went on to sing many more songs for Rishi Kapoor in the subsequent hit films, including Hum Kisise Kum Naheen (1977) and Amar Akbar Anthony (1977). In 1977, he won both Filmfare Award and the National Award for the song "Kya Hua Tera Wada" from the movie Hum Kisise Kum Naheen, composed by R. D. Burman. He was nominated as the best singer at the Filmfare Awards for the qawwali "Parda Hai Parda" from Amar Akbar Anthony (1977).

Rafi sang for many successful films in the late 1970s and the early 1980s many of whose hit songs were dominating the charts in the late 70s on radio programs such as Vividh Bharati, Binaca Geetmala and Radio Ceylon. Some of these include Pratiggya (1975), Bairaag (1976), Amaanat (1977), Dharam Veer (1977), Apnapan (1977), Ganga Ki Saugand (1978), Suhaag (1979), Sargam (1979), Qurbani (1980), Dostana (1980), Karz (1980), The Burning Train (1980), Abdullah (1980), Shaan (1980), Aasha (1980), Aap To Aise Na The (1980), Naseeb (1981) and Zamaane Ko Dikhana Hai (1981). In 1977, Rafi gave a performance at the Royal Albert Hall and in 1980 he performed at the Wembley conference centre. From 1970 until his death he toured around the world extensively giving concert performances to packed halls.

In December 1979, Rafi recorded six songs for the Hindi remake of Dilip Sen's Bengali superhit Sorry Madam; the film was never completed due to a personal tragedy in Dilip Sen's life. These songs, written by Kafeel Aazar and composed by Chitragupta, were released digitally in December 2009 by the label Silk Road under the title "The Last Songs". The physical album was released only in India by Universal.

=== Guinness World Records controversy ===
During his last years, Rafi was involved in a controversy over Lata Mangeshkar's entry in the Guinness Book of World Records. In a letter dated 11 June 1977 to the Guinness Book of World Records, Rafi had challenged the claim that Lata Mangeshkar has recorded the highest number of songs ("not less than 25,000" according to Guinness). Rafi, according to his fans, would have sung more songs than Lata – he being the senior of the two. They estimated the number of songs sung by Rafi to be anything from 25,000 to 26,000. This prompted Rafi to write a letter, in protest, to Guinness. After receiving a reply from Guinness, in a letter dated 20 November 1979, he wrote, "I am disappointed that my request for a reassessment vis-a-vis Ms Mangeshkar's reported world record has gone unheeded." In an interview to BBC recorded in November 1977, Rafi claimed to have sung 25,000 to 26,000 songs till then.

After Rafi's death, in its 1984 edition, the Guinness Book of World Records gave Lata Mangeshkar's name for the "Most Recordings" and stated, "Mohammad Rafi (d 1 August 1980) [sic] claimed to have recorded 28,000 songs in 11 Indian languages between 1944 and April 1980." The Guinness Book entries for both Rafi and Lata were eventually deleted in 1991. In 2011, Lata's sister Asha Bhosle was given the title.

Mohammed Rafi – Golden Voice of the Silver Screen, a 2015 book by Shahid Rafi and Sujata Dev, states that according to "industry sources", Rafi sang 4,425 Hindi film songs, 310 non-Hindi film songs, and 328 non-film songs between 1945 and 1980. A 2015 Manorama Online article states that "researchers" have found 7,405 songs sung by Rafi.

Among the prominent leading actors of his time, Rafi sung 190 songs for Shammi Kapoor, 145 for Johnny Walker, 129 for Shashi Kapoor, 114 for Dharmendra, 100 for Dev Anand, 79 for Sunil Dutt and 77 for Dilip Kumar.

== Death ==
Mohammed Rafi died at 10:25 pm on 31 July 1980, following a massive heart attack, aged 55. The last song sung by Rafi was for the movie Aas Paas, with music by Laxmikant-Pyarelal. One source says it was "Shaam Phir Kyun Udaas Hai Dost/Tu Kahin Aas Paas Hai Dost", recorded just hours before his death. Another source says that the last song he sang was "Shehar mein charcha hai", from the same film.

Rafi was buried at the Juhu Muslim cemetery and his burial was one of the largest funeral processions in India as over 10,000 people attended his burial. The government of India announced a two-day public mourning in his honour.

In 2010, Rafi's tomb along with many film industry artists such as Madhubala, was demolished to make space for new burials. Fans of Mohammed Rafi, who visit his tomb twice a year to mark his birth and death anniversaries, use the coconut tree that is nearest to his grave as a marker.

== Legacy ==
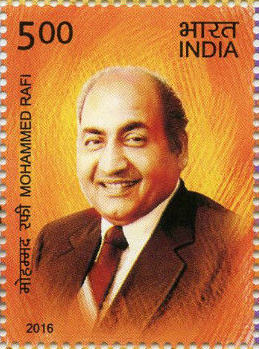
Rafi on a 2016 stamp of India

Rafi's style of singing influenced singers like Kavita Krishnamurti, Mahendra Kapoor, Mohammed Aziz, Shabbir Kumar, Udit Narayan, Sonu Nigam, and S. P. Balasubrahmanyam. Anwar also imitated Rafi's voice.

On 22 September 2007, a shrine to Rafi designed by artist Tasawar Bashir was unveiled on Fazeley Street, Birmingham, UK. Bashir is hoping that Rafi will attain sainthood as a result. The Padma Shri Mohammed Rafi Chowk in the Bandra suburbs of Mumbai and Pune (extending MG Road) is named after Rafi.

In the summer of 2008, the City of Birmingham Symphony Orchestra released a double CD titled Rafi Resurrected, comprising 16 songs by Rafi. Bollywood playback singer Sonu Nigam provided the vocals for this project and toured with the CBSO in July 2008 at venues including the English National Opera in London, Manchester's Apollo Theatre, and Symphony Hall, Birmingham.

There have been appeals to the Government of India to honour the singer, posthumously, with the Bharat Ratna (India's Highest Civilian Award).

In June 2010, Rafi, along with Mangeshkar, was voted the most popular playback singer in the poll, conducted by Outlook magazine. The same poll voted "Man re, tu kahe na dheer dhare" (Chitralekha, 1964), sung by Rafi, as the No. 1 song. Three songs were tied for the No. 2 spot; two were sung by Rafi. The songs were "Tere mere sapne ab ek rang hain" (Guide, 1965) and "Din dhal jaye, hai raat na jaye" (Guide, 1965). The jury included people in the Indian music industry.

In 2015, the UK-based newspaper Eastern Eye placed Rafi third in their "Greatest 20 Bollywood Playback Singers" list.

An official biography was written on Rafi's life by Sujata Dev titled Mohammed Rafi – Golden Voice of the Silver Screen launched on his 91st birthday. As well as an award winning documentary titled Dastaan-E-Rafi directed by Rajni Acharya and Vinay Patel (which took 5 years to make) was released to commemorate his 92nd birthday which was later released on DVD. It featured over 60 interviews of various Bollywood personas and closely recalled his story through his songs and the personal recounts.

Lata Mangeshkar, his contemporary, has said that "Rafi bhaiya was not only India's greatest playback singer but also a wonderful person" and that "he was one singer whose vocal range could outclass any other singer, whether it was me, Asha, Mannada or Kishore bhaiya".

When producer-director Manmohan Desai (who was a big fan of Rafi) and used him in numerous hit films, was asked to describe the voice of Rafi he remarked that "If anyone has the voice of god, it is Mohammed Rafi".

Annually his birth and death anniversaries inspire several thousand musical tributes on stage, radio and television.

Rafi's popularity today spans across the Indian subcontinent, having a reach to Indian communities in Singapore and Malaysia.

Today, Rafi's popular songs continue to be remixed or recreated.

Rafi's Baharon Phool Barsao was voted the most popular Hindi song in a BBC Asia Network poll commemorating 100 years of Hindi Cinema.

In a CNN-IBN survey in 2013, he was voted the greatest voice of Hindi Cinema.

In 2001, Rafi was named as the "best singer of the millennium" by Hero Honda and Stardust magazine.

== In popular culture ==
- Mohammed Rafi Academy was launched in Mumbai on 31 July 2010 on the 30th anniversary of the singer's death, started by his son Shahid Rafi to impart training in Indian classical and contemporary music.
- After his death, numerous Hindi movies were dedicated to Rafi, including: Allah Rakha, Mard, Coolie, Desh-Premee, Naseeb, Aas-Paas and Heeralal-Pannalal.
- A song in the 1990 Hindi film Kroadh "Na Fankar Tujhsa" picturised on actor Amitabh Bachchan and sung by singer Mohammed Aziz was also dedicated to the memory of Rafi.
- Rafi is one of the recording artists mentioned in the 1997 hit British alternative rock song "Brimful of Asha" by Cornershop.
- Rafi's song from the film Gumnaam (1965), "Jaan Pehechan Ho", was used on the soundtrack of Ghost World (2001). The film opens with the lead character dancing around in her bedroom to a video of Gumnaam. The song has also been used for Heineken's 2011 "The Date" commercial.
- Rafi was commemorated on his 93rd birth anniversary by Search Engine Google which showed a special doodle on its Indian home page for him on 24 December 2017.
- His "Aaj Mausam Bada Beiman Hai" is featured in the 2001 film Monsoon Wedding. His "Kya Mil Gaya" (Sasural, 1961) has been used in The Guru (2002), where Ramu and Sharonna sing a version of the song. His song "Mera Man Tera Pyasa" (Gambler, 1970) has been used as one of the soundtracks in the Jim Carrey-Kate Winslet starrer Eternal Sunshine of the Spotless Mind (2004). This song is played in the background in Kate Winslet's character's home while the lead pair are having a drink (at approximately 00.11.14 runtime).

== Personal life ==
Rafi married twice; his first marriage was to his cousin, Bashira Bibi, which took place in his ancestral village. The marriage ended when his first wife refused to live in India following the killing of her parents during the riots of the Partition of India and moved to Lahore, Pakistan. His second marriage was to Bilquis Bano.

Rafi had four sons and three daughters; his first son, Saeed, was from his first marriage. Rafi's hobbies included playing badminton, carrom, and flying kites. He was a teetotaller and abstained from smoking and he stayed away from parties in the industry.

According to Mohammed Rafi Voice of a Nation, a book authorised by Rafi's son Shahid, described him as "a gentle, and calm demeanour persona who remained humble, selfless, ego-less, devoted, God-fearing, and family-loving gentleman in his life." Rafi was noted for not sending anyone he met back empty-handed. He contributed to the society by helping people through his charity and notable deeds.

== See also ==
- List of songs recorded by Mohammed Rafi
- List of Indian playback singers
