= Kotla Sultan Singh =

Village in Punjab, India

Coordinates: 31°47′N 75°00′E

Kotla Sultan Singh is a village near Amritsar city in the Amritsar district of Punjab, India.

It is the birthplace of playback singer Mohammed Rafi. There have been many attempts by his fans to get a memorial to him built in his native village.
