= Polish Tourist and Sightseeing Society =

Tourism in Poland

- Polskie Towarzystwo Turystyczno-Krajoznawcze
- Abbreviation: PTTK
- Predecessor: Polskie Towarzystwo Tatrzańskie
- Formation: 1950; 76 years ago
- Type: NGO
- Registration no.: 0000100817
- Legal status: Association
- Purpose: Educational
- Headquarters: Warsaw
- Region served: Poland
- Members: 61,000
- Main organ: Assembly
- Affiliations: AIT, NFI, EUROPARC Federation, CMAS
- Website: pttk.pl
- Formerly called: Polish Sightseeing Society

The Polish Tourist and Sightseeing Society (Polish: Polskie Towarzystwo Turystyczno-Krajoznawcze, PTTK) is a Polish non-governmental tourist organization with 312 branches across the country.

The PTTK is one of the oldest tourist societies in Europe. Its origins stretch back to the foreign Partitions of Poland. In August 1873 a group of tourism enthusiasts including painter and photographer Walery Eljasz Radzikowski from Kraków and physician Tytus Chałubiński founded the Polish cultural Tatra Society (Polskie Towarzystwo Tatrzańskie, originally the "Galician" Tatra Society for the Austrian censorship). A parallel Polish Sightseeing Society (Polskie Towarzystwo Krajoznawcze) was founded by ethnographer Zygmunt Gloger in 1906. The two organizations merged after World War II in 1950 to form the PTTK.

== Current Operations ==
The Society aims to promote qualified tourism and sightseeing. Its activities include designing and marking tourist trails as well as cycling, horse and river trails throughout Poland; maintaining a network of tourist accommodations, including museums and libraries; running several courses and workshops; training and certifying official travel guides, and publishing maps and guidebooks.

The Polish Tourist and Sightseeing Society has approximately 61,000 members, with over 260 branches throughout Poland. It brings together about 2,500 rings and nearly 200 clubs. It runs accommodation facilities of a varying standards with over 20 thousand beds; including, in 60 tourist homes, 77 mountain chalets, 35 hostels and water sports facilities, 5 inns, and 33 campgrounds; along with a network of 16 museums. The society is organised into several regional authorities each with its own staff. The membership fee and the PTTK membership card provide a discount on all accommodation and courses offered by PTTK. Each member of the Polish Tourist Association is a paying member awarded with one of a system of over a dozen badges, including Climbing, Hiking, Skiing, Cycling, Sailing and even a Diving Badge. The PTTK Society is a member of international tourist organizations such as the Alliance Internationale de Tourisme, the Naturfreunde Internationale, the Federation of Nature and National Parks of Europe, and the Confédération Mondiale des Activités Subaquatiques.

Notable locations
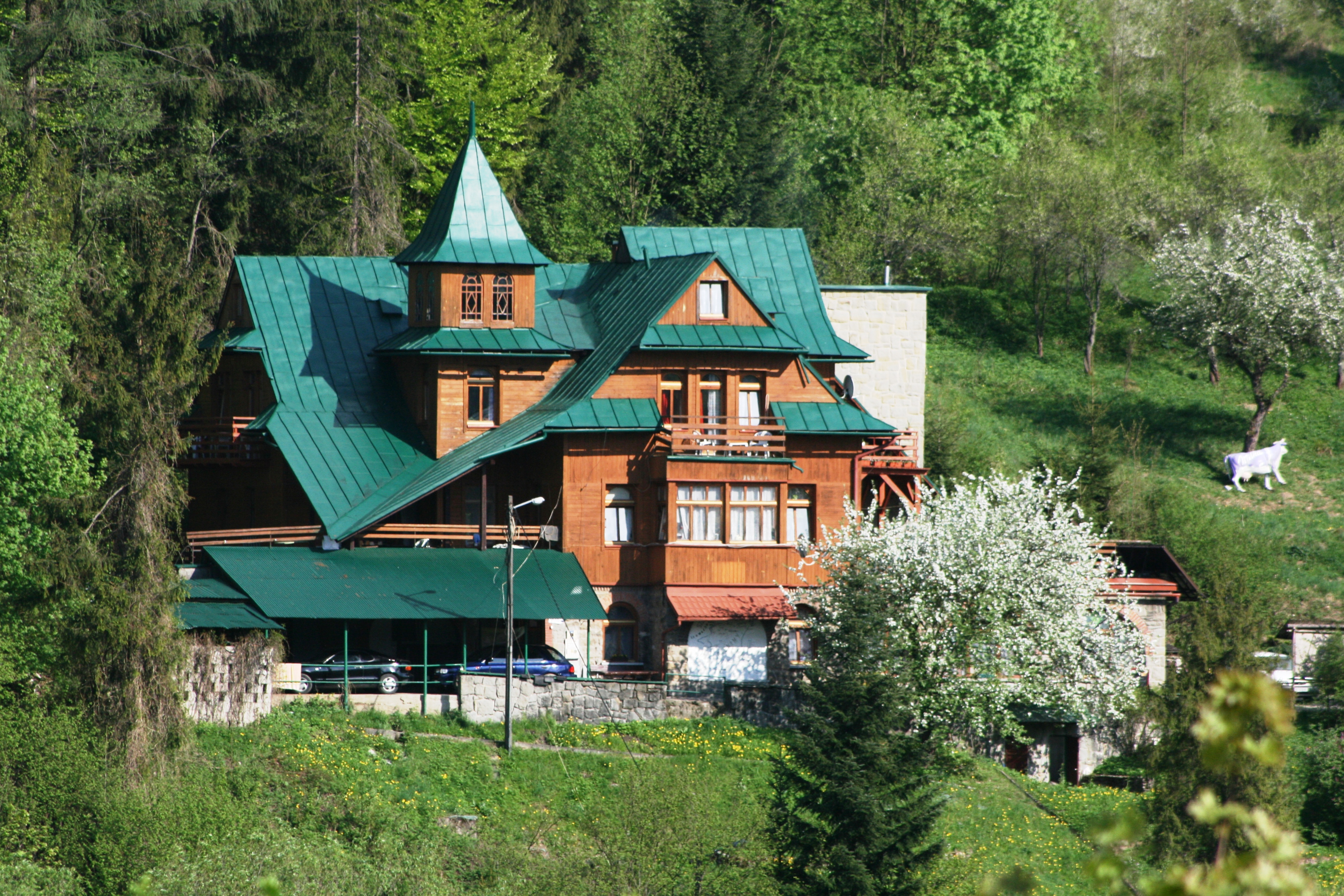
PTTK Orlica in Pieniny
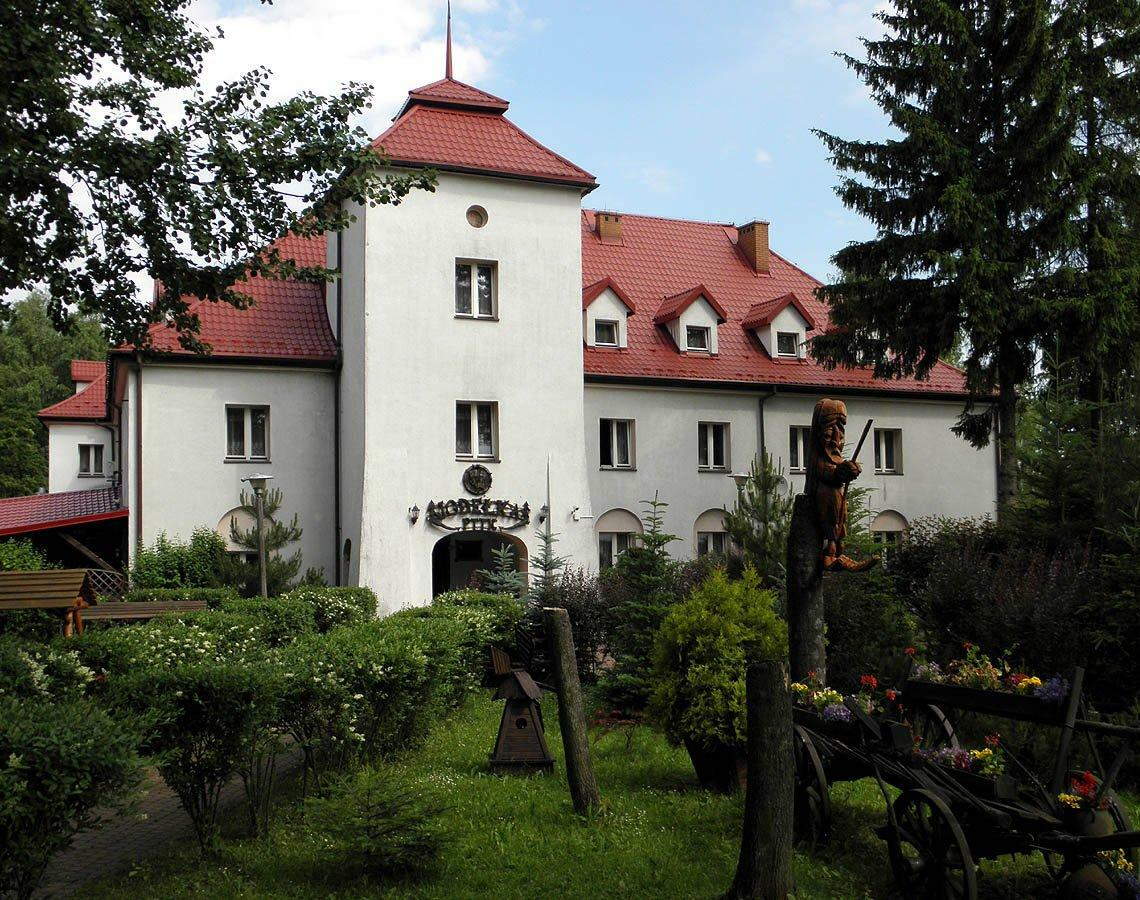
PTTK Jodełka, Holy Cross Mountains

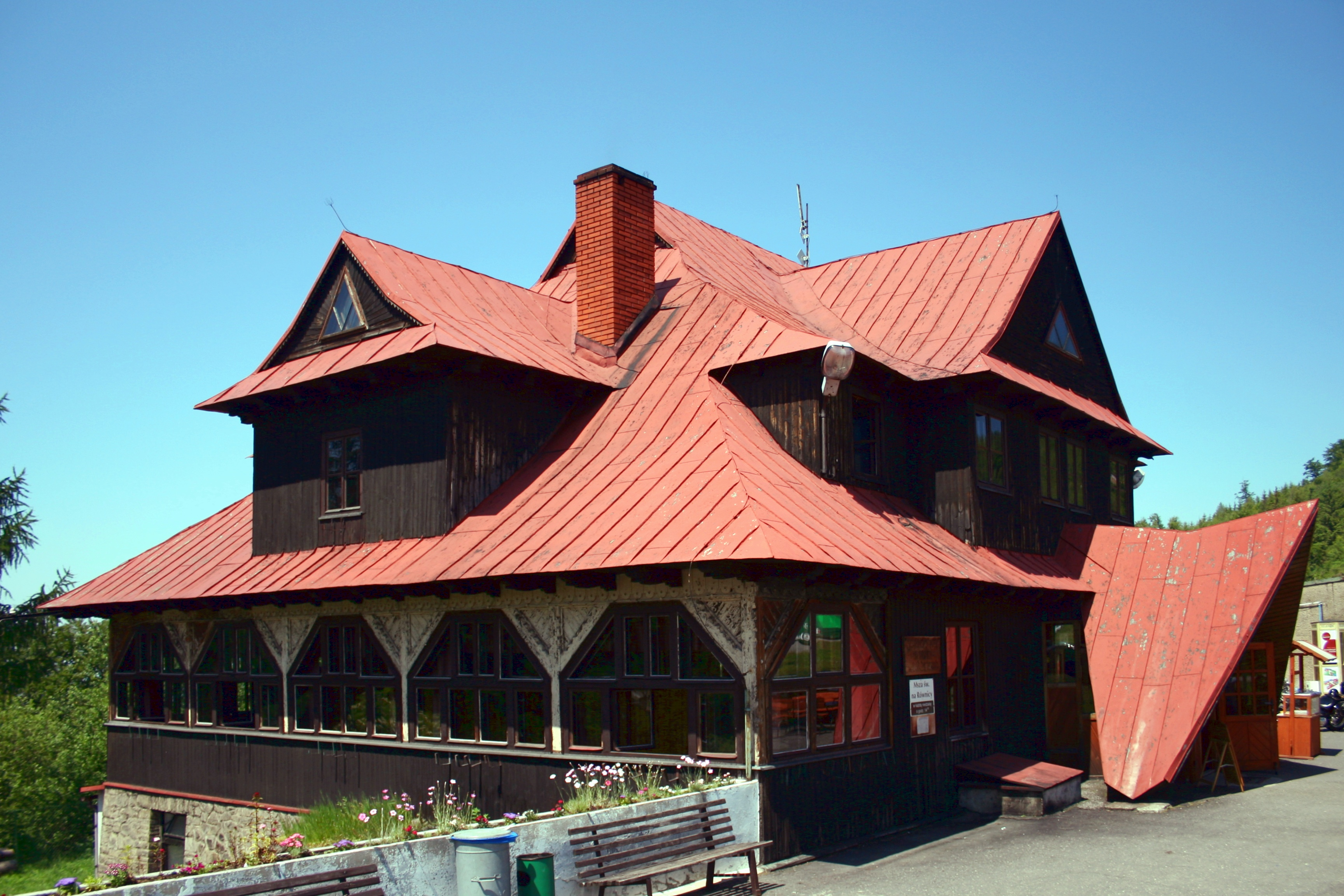
PTTK Na Równicy, Beskid Śląski range

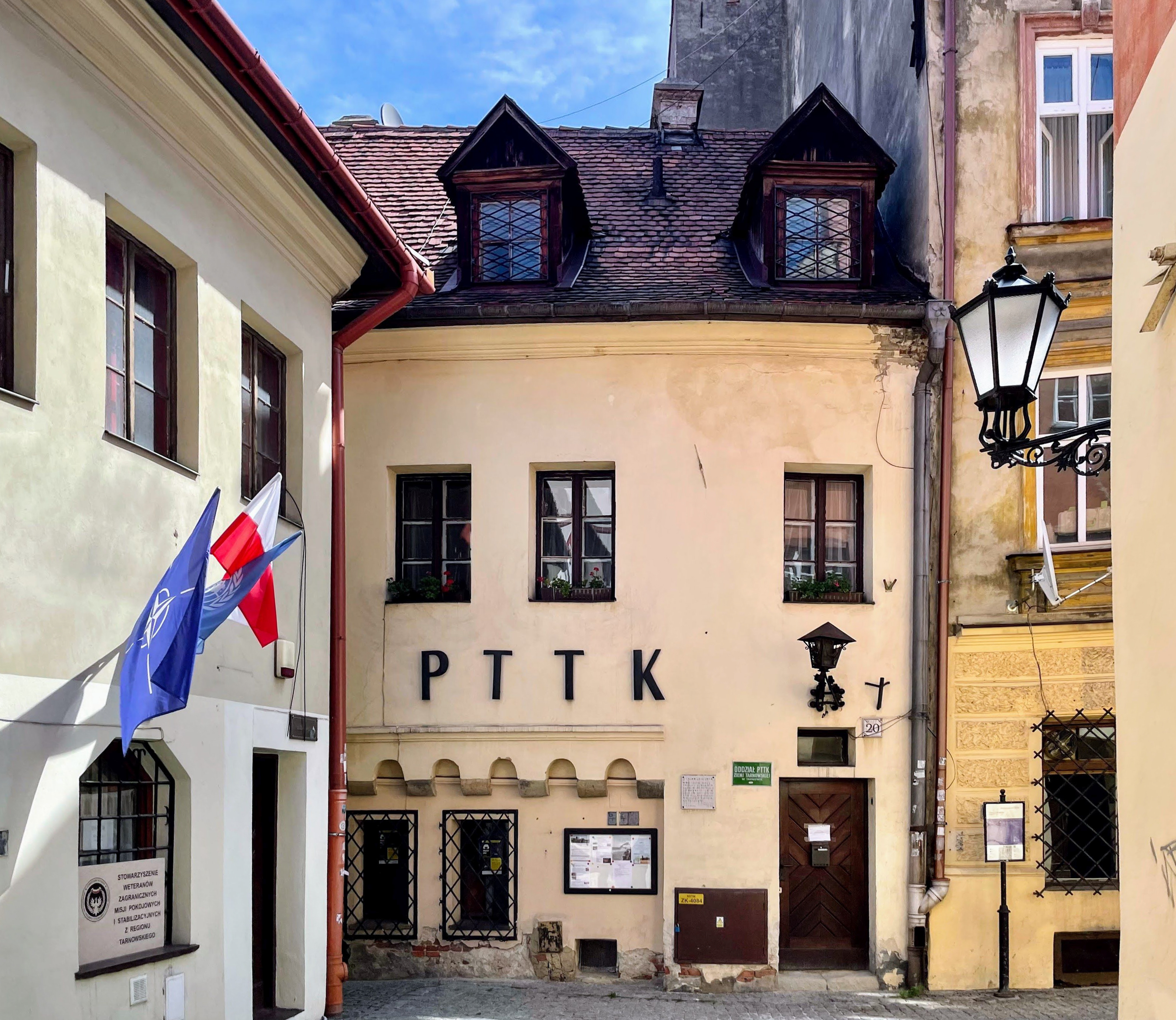
PTTK branch in the Florentine House in Tarnów
