= Greece at the 1968 Summer Olympics =

- IOC code: GRE
- NOC: Committee of the Olympic Games

in Mexico City Mexico
- Competitors: 44 (44 men and 0 women) in 7 sports
- Flag bearer: Khristos Papanikolaou
- Medals Ranked 42nd: Gold 0 Silver 0 Bronze 1 Total 1

Summer Olympics appearances (overview)
- 1896; 1900; 1904; 1908; 1912; 1920; 1924; 1928; 1932; 1936; 1948; 1952; 1956; 1960; 1964; 1968; 1972; 1976; 1980; 1984; 1988; 1992; 1996; 2000; 2004; 2008; 2012; 2016; 2020; 2024

Other related appearances
- 1906 Intercalated Games

Greece competed at the 1968 Summer Olympics in Mexico City, Mexico. 44 competitors, all men, took part in 27 events in 7 sports. Greek athletes have competed in every Summer Olympic Games.

== Medalists ==
Medal	Name	Sport	Event	Date
Bronze	Petros Galaktopoulos	Wrestling	Men's Greco-Roman 70 kg	26 October

== Athletics ==
Christos Papanikolaou, pole vault (5,35 m): 4th place

== Shooting ==
Seven shooters, all men, represented Greece in 1968.

25 m pistol

- Alkiviadis Papageorgopoulos

50 m rifle, prone

- Lambis Manthos
- Ioannis Skarafingas

Trap

- Georgios Pangalos
- Markos Tzoumaras

Skeet

- Panagiotis Xanthakos
- Menelaos Mikhailidis

== Water polo ==
Men's Team Competition

- Preliminary Round (Group B)

- Lost to Netherlands (5:9)
- Lost to Japan (7:8)
- Defeated United Arab Republic (7:6)
- Lost to East Germany (4:11)
- Lost to Mexico (8:11)
- Lost to Yugoslavia (1:11)
- Lost to Italy (2:6)

- Classification Matches

- 13th/14th place: Lost to Brazil (2:5) → Fourteenth place

- Team Roster

- Andreas Garifallos
- Dimitrios Kougevetopoulos
- Georgios Palikaris
- Georgios Theodorakopoulos
- Ioannis Palios
- Ioannis Thimaras
- Kyriakos Iosifidis
- Nikolaos Tsangas
- Panagiotis Mathioudakis
- Panagiotis Mikhalos
- Thomas Karalogos
