= Greece at the 1972 Summer Olympics =

- IOC code: GRE
- NOC: Committee of the Olympic Games

in Munich West Germany
- Competitors: 60 (58 men and 2 women) in 9 sports
- Flag bearer: Khristos Papanikolaou
- Medals Ranked 29th: Gold 0 Silver 2 Bronze 0 Total 2

Summer Olympics appearances (overview)
- 1896; 1900; 1904; 1908; 1912; 1920; 1924; 1928; 1932; 1936; 1948; 1952; 1956; 1960; 1964; 1968; 1972; 1976; 1980; 1984; 1988; 1992; 1996; 2000; 2004; 2008; 2012; 2016; 2020; 2024; 2028

Other related appearances
- 1906 Intercalated Games

Greece competed at the 1972 Summer Olympics in Munich, West Germany. 60 competitors, 58 men and 2 women, took part in 46 events in 9 sports. Greek athletes have competed in every Summer Olympic Games.

== Medalists ==
Medal	Name	Sport	Event	Date
Silver	Ilias Khatzipavlis	Sailing	Finn	September 8
Silver	Petros Galaktopoulos	Wrestling	Men's Greco-Roman 74 kg	September 10

== Athletics ==
Men's 400 metres hurdles

- Stavros Tziortzis

- Final — 49.66 (→ 6th place)

Men's 400 metres

- Kyriakos Onisiforou

- Quarterfinals — 47.22 (→ did not advance)

Men's 1500 metres

- Spilios Zacharopoulos

- Heat — 3:43.8
- Semifinals — 3:43.5 (→ did not advance)

Men's High Jump

- Vassilios Papadimitriou

- Qualifying Round — 2.15m
- Final — 2.15m (→ 12th place)

- Ioannis Koussoulas

- Qualification Round — 2.12m (→ did not advance)

== Boxing ==
Men's Light Middleweight (– 71 kg)

- Evengelos Oikonomakos

- First Round — Bye
- Second Round — Defeated Nicolas Aquilino (PHI), 5:0
- Third Round — Lost to Dieter Kottysch (FRG), 0:5

== Fencing ==
Three fencers, all men, represented Greece in 1972.

Men's foil

- Andreas Vgenopoulos

Men's épée

- Panagiotis Dourakos
- Andreas Vgenopoulos

Men's sabre

- Ioannis Khatzisarantos

== Sailing ==
Open

Athlete	Event	Race							Net points	Final rank
Athlete	Event	1	2	3	4	5	6	7	Net points	Final rank
Ilias Hatzipavlis	Finn	2	9	8	10	4	~~DNF~~	9	71.0	Silver medal
Anastasios Batistas; Antonios Bonas; Khristos Bonas	Flying Dutchman	17	20	10	~~DNF~~	DNF	17	9	137.0	22
loannis Giapalakis; Panayotis Michail loannis Kioussis	Dragon	13	7	10	~~18~~	17	14	—N/a	91.0	17

== Shooting ==
Five male shooters represented Greece in 1972.

Open

Athlete	Event	Final	
Athlete	Event	Score	Rank
Lakis Georgiou	Skeet	192	8
Dimitrios Kotronis	50 m pistol	539	38
Lambis Manthos	50 metre rifle prone	593	27
Ioannis Skarafingas	50 metre rifle prone	593	26
Panagiotis Xanthakos	Skeet	190	21

== Swimming ==
Men

Athlete	Event	Heat		Semifinal		Final	
Athlete	Event	Time	Rank	Time	Rank	Time	Rank
Dimitrios Karydis	100 metre butterfly	1:00.06	7	Did not advance			
Theodoros Koutoumanis	100 metre breaststroke	1:12.05	7	Did not advance			
Dimitrios Theodoropoulos	400 metre freestyle	4:30.54	7	Did not advance			
Dimitrios Theodoropoulos	1500 metre freestyle	16:17.61	DQ	Did not advance			

Women

Athlete	Event	Heat		Semifinal		Final	
Athlete	Event	Time	Rank	Time	Rank	Time	Rank
Eleni Avlonitou	400 metre freestyle	4:52.10	7	Did not advance			
Eleni Avlonitou	800 metre freestyle	10:10.88	7	Did not advance			
Eleni Avlonitou	200 metre medley	2:39.10	6	Did not advance			
Eleni Avlonitou	400 metre medley	5:32.49	7	Did not advance			
Mairi Ioannidou	100 metre breaststroke	1:21.705	7	Did not advance			
Mairi Ioannidou	200 metre breaststroke	2:53.53	31	Did not advance			

== Water polo ==
=== Pool B ===
Nation	Pld	W	D	L	GF	GA
Hungary	4	3	1	0	22	6
West Germany	4	2	2	0	21	13
Netherlands	4	2	1	1	14	11
Australia	4	0	1	3	14	27
Greece	4	0	1	3	13	27

	27 August		1st	2nd	3rd	4th
Greece	7-7	Australia	3-3	2-1	1-2	1-1

	29 August		1st	2nd	3rd	4th
Greece	1-6	Hungary	0-3	0-0	0-2	1-1

	30 August		1st	2nd	3rd	4th
West Germany	8-3	Greece	3-1	3-1	1-1	1-0

	31 August		1st	2nd	3rd	4th
Greece	2-6	Netherlands	1-0	0-2	1-3	0-1

- Team Roster

- Dimitrios Konstas
- Georgios Theodorakopoulos
- Evangelos Voultsos
- Kyriakos Iossifidis
- Dimitrios Kougevetopoulos
- Periklis Damaskus
- Thomas Karalogos
- Ioannis Karalogos
- Efstathios Sarantos
- Ioannis Palios
- Panagiotis Michalos

== Weightlifting ==
Men

Athlete	Event	Military press		Snatch		Clean & Jerk		Total	Rank
Athlete	Event	Result	Rank	Result	Rank	Result	Rank	Total	Rank
Eleftherios Stefanoudakis	67.5 kg	117.5	21	120	11	142.5	18	380	17
Panagiotis Spyrou	75 kg	145	13	117.5	18	167.5	10	430	12
Khristos Iakovou	82.5 kg	170	2	137.5	8	187.5	3	490	5
Nikos Iliadis	90 kg	155	11	135	12	180	10	470	11
