= Piraeus derby =

Sports rivalry in Piraeus, Greece

- Location: Piraeus, Greece
- Teams: Ethnikos Piraeus; Olympiacos F.C.
- First meeting: Piraeus Regional Championship - May 17, 1925; Olympiacos 4–2 Ethnikos, Leoforos Alexandras Stadium
- Latest meeting: A' Ethniki - May 12, 1999; Ethnikos 0–3 Olympiacos, Karaiskakis Stadium

Statistics
- Most wins: Olympiacos F.C.
- Largest victory: For Olympiacos Olympiacos 5–0 Ethnikos (seasons 1965–66 and 1967–68) For Ethnikos Ethnikos 4–2 Olympiacos (seasons 1928–29 and 1938–39)

The Piraeus derby, is a traditional association football and water polo rivalry between Ethnikos Piraeus and Olympiacos, the 2 teams representing the city of Piraeus, Greece. Ethnikos was founded on November 21, 1923, while Olympiacos was founded on March 10, 1925. The two teams are one of the most successful multi sports clubs in Greece in terms of honours, with Olympiacos being the team with the most titles in the five biggest team sports (football, basketball, water polo, volleyball and handball), while Ethnikos being fifth.

Olympiacos has never been relegated in football and water polo while Ethnikos has four relegations from the first division of Greek football (1990, 1992, 1996, 1999) and 2 relegations in water polo (2009, 2012).

Once a major derby for the power of the Piraeus city, especially pre WWII, but since Olympiacos' dominance in the 90's and afterwards along with the steady decline of Ethnikos, has led to the derby losing importance over the last 25 years in football, however the rivalry still exists in water polo.

Olympiacos traditionally represented the mass and lower classes of the city of Piraeus and its suburbs while Ethnikos, in contrary, represented the upper class of the city of Piraeus and not much of its suburbs.

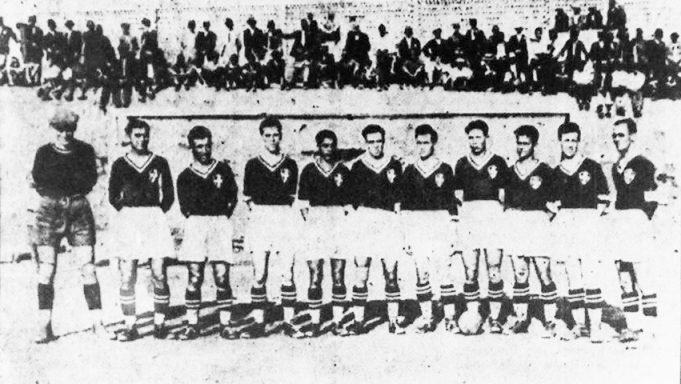
Ethnikos cup winning team in 1933

== History ==
=== Football ===
Since the two clubs were established in the mid-1920s, Ethnikos' traditional local rival has been Olympiacos CFP, one of the two most popular and successful multi-sport clubs in Greece along with Panathinaikos.

While a legitimate rivalry between Ethnikos and Olympiacos still exists in water polo (Ethnikos Piraeus Water Polo Club has won the most Greek water polo championships of any club, while Olympiacos Water Polo Club has won the second-most), that is no longer the case in football.

Ethnikos and Olympiacos F.C. were more or less evenly matched and had great battles for Piraeus supremacy in the 1920s and 1930s, but thereafter Olympiacos became increasingly more powerful and successful and began to pass Ethnikos by.

In 1956, Olympiacos won the championship with Ethnikos finishing second meaning the first and only time in which the top two positions in the league were occupied by Piraeus's teams.

One of Ethnikos's most important wins (if not the most important) is the semifinal win in the 1932-33 Greek Cup when he beat Olympiacos 2–1 in a knockout match.

Ethnikos was relegated in 1990 to the second division, a sad moment for the club who was never relegated since its foundation in 1923. Nevertheless, Olympiacos fans celebrated it.

Along the way, Olympiacos developed a habit for luring Ethnikos' best players, like Greece men's national football team players Philippos Kourantis in the late 1920s, Giannis Chelmis in the late 1930s and Giannis Ioannou in the early 1950s. This habit continued in the later decades with Christos Arvanitis, Tasos Mitropoulos, Stavros Papadopoulos, Thomas Rohrbach.

In 1956–57 Olympiacos were seemingly behind a scandal that robbed Ethnikos of the national championship. Ethnikos was favorite for the title with 4 matches left in the season, and had the derby with Olympiacos next on the schedule; but before the derby arrived Ethnikos was dubiously disqualified from the competition. With Ethnikos out of the way Olympiacos ultimately took the Championship.

In 1973, Ethnikos lost the great Michalis Kritikopoulos to Olympiacos, just a year before Ethnikos mounted its greatest challenge for the national championship in the modern era; many Ethnikos fans feel that if they still had Kritikopoulos, the team would have managed to hold on to 1st place rather than run out of gas in the second half of the 1974–75 season.

Olympiacos ultimately became the dominant football club in Greece, having won the League and Cup more than any other club, and Ethnikos has not been able to seriously compete with them for decades. Ethnikos has not defeated Olympiacos in a league match since the 1985–86 season and has not finished above Olympiacos in the league standings since the 1987–88 season.

In the 1990s, when Olympiacos was experiencing probably the greatest era of its history while Ethnikos was suffering through what was surely its worst, Ethnikos lost some of their fanbase to Olympiacos.

A recent point of contention for Ethnikos fans has to do with Karaiskakis Stadium. Karaiskakis is the traditional home of both Olympiacos and Ethnikos, but only Olympiacos has played there since the stadium was rebuilt for use in the 2004 Summer Olympics.

=== Water polo ===
Olympiacos and Ethnikos are the greatest clubs in the history of men's Greece water polo. Since their foundation, the two clubs were among the strongest in Greek water polo. Before the start of WW2, Olympiacos had won four championship in contrast to Ethnikos's two. After WW2, both clubs remained a dominant force along with NO Patras, fighting for the title almost every year. From 1945 to 1952, NOP won three titles, Olympiacos four and Ethnikos one.

In 1953, Ethnikos started a dynasty of almost 40 years claiming 33 championships in 38 years. The Greek cup that started in 1953 was abolished in 1958 due to unprecedented dominance of Ethnikos who had achieved six straight doubles in 1958. Olympiacos had great difficulty in beating rival Ethnikos, let alone winning the championship. Olympiacos managed to beat Ethnikos from 1952 to 1989 only 8 times in 91 matches. From 1952 to 1964 and from 1979 to 1990, Ethnikos was unbeaten against Olympiacos. However, Olympiacos managed to get two titles. One was shared with Ethnikos in 1969 because of a suspended final match and the other one came in 1971 when the “reds” managed to take the crown of Ethnikos off after 18 consecutive championships for the “blues”. Hall of famer Ivo Trumbić was the coach of Olympiacos.

Since 1992, Olympiacos has won all championships except for five seasons (1994, 1997, 1998, 2006, 2012) and has won also the LEN Champions League twice in 2002 and 2018. Ethnikos has managed only two championships (1994, 2006) and two cups (2000, 2005). Ethnikos' s last win against Olympiacos came in 2008.

== Head to Head ==
=== Football ===
Olympiacos's biggest win is 5–0 twice (1966, 1968) while Ethnikos's is 4–2 twice (1929, 1939)

Since 1960 and the introduction of A' Ethniki, Olympiakos won 53 times, Ethnikos 4 times and 15 matches ended as a draw.

Last win for Ethnikos is in 1986 in Olympic Stadium (2–0) while Olympiacos's is the last match they played each other in 1999 (0–3 for Olympiacos).

==== Summary of matches for Greek league and cup ====
Competition	630px seven vertical stripes HEX-ED1C24 and White	Draw	Five blue four white striped flag
Panhellenic Championship (1928–1959)	12	6	6
A' Ethniki (1960–)	53	15	4
Greek Cup (1932–)	7	2	2
Total	72	23	12

==== List of matches for the top division ====
Year	Competition	Rivals	Score
1931	Panhellenic championship	Olympiacos - Ethnikos	4–1
1931	Panhellenic championship	Ethnikos - Olympiacos	1–1
1932	Panhellenic championship	Olympiacos - Ethnikos	2–2
1932	Panhellenic championship	Ethnikos - Olympiacos	1–0
1933	Panhellenic championship	Olympiacos - Ethnikos	2–0
1933	Panhellenic championship	Ethnikos - Olympiacos	1–2
1934	Panhellenic championship	Olympiacos - Ethnikos	1–1
1934	Panhellenic championship	Ethnikos - Olympiacos	3–2
1935	Panhellenic championship	Olympiacos - Ethnikos	5–2
1935	Panhellenic championship	Ethnikos - Olympiacos	1–2
1936	Panhellenic championship	Olympiacos - Ethnikos	2–1
1936	Panhellenic championship	Ethnikos - Olympiacos	1–2
1939	Panhellenic championship	Olympiacos - Ethnikos	2–2
1939	Panhellenic championship	Ethnikos - Olympiacos	4–2
1940	Panhellenic championship	Olympiacos - Ethnikos	0–2
1940	Panhellenic championship	Ethnikos - Olympiacos	0–4
1956	Panhellenic championship	Olympiacos - Ethnikos	2–0
1956	Panhellenic championship	Ethnikos - Olympiacos	0–1
1956	Panhellenic championship	Olympiacos - Ethnikos	0–0
1956	Panhellenic championship	Ethnikos - Olympiacos	2–1
1957	Panhellenic championship	Olympiacos - Ethnikos	0–1
1957	Panhellenic championship	Ethnikos - Olympiacos	0–2 (w/o)
1958	Panhellenic championship	Olympiacos - Ethnikos	4–1
1958	Panhellenic championship	Ethnikos - Olympiacos	2–2
1959	Panhellenic championship	Olympiacos - Ethnikos	3–1
1959	Panhellenic championship	Ethnikos - Olympiacos	2–3
1960	A' Ethniki	Olympiacos - Ethnikos	2–0
1960	A' Ethniki	Ethnikos - Olympiacos	3–3
1961	A' Ethniki	Olympiacos - Ethnikos	2–0
1961	A' Ethniki	Ethnikos - Olympiacos	1–0
1962	A' Ethniki	Olympiacos - Ethnikos	2–1
1962	A' Ethniki	Ethnikos - Olympiacos	1–2
1963	A' Ethniki	Olympiacos - Ethnikos	2–1
1963	A' Ethniki	Ethnikos - Olympiacos	1–1
1964	A' Ethniki	Olympiacos - Ethnikos	1–0
1964	A' Ethniki	Ethnikos - Olympiacos	0–1
1965	A' Ethniki	Olympiacos - Ethnikos	4–2
1965	A' Ethniki	Ethnikos - Olympiacos	0–2
1966	A' Ethniki	Olympiacos - Ethnikos	5–0
1966	A' Ethniki	Ethnikos - Olympiacos	0–4
1967	A' Ethniki	Olympiacos - Ethnikos	2–1
1967	A' Ethniki	Ethnikos - Olympiacos	3–3
1968	A' Ethniki	Olympiacos - Ethnikos	5–0
1968	A' Ethniki	Ethnikos - Olympiacos	2–2
1969	A' Ethniki	Olympiacos - Ethnikos	1–0
1969	A' Ethniki	Ethnikos - Olympiacos	2–4
1970	A' Ethniki	Olympiacos - Ethnikos	1–0
1970	A' Ethniki	Ethnikos - Olympiacos	0–4
1971	A' Ethniki	Olympiacos - Ethnikos	0–1
1971	A' Ethniki	Ethnikos - Olympiacos	0–2
1972	A' Ethniki	Olympiacos - Ethnikos	3–1
1972	A' Ethniki	Ethnikos - Olympiacos	0–0
1973	A' Ethniki	Olympiacos - Ethnikos	3–0
1973	A' Ethniki	Ethnikos - Olympiacos	1–2
1974	A' Ethniki	Olympiacos - Ethnikos	2–1
1974	A' Ethniki	Ethnikos - Olympiacos	1–1
1975	A' Ethniki	Olympiacos - Ethnikos	1–1
1975	A' Ethniki	Ethnikos - Olympiacos	1–2
1976	A' Ethniki	Olympiacos - Ethnikos	0–2
1976	A' Ethniki	Ethnikos - Olympiacos	2–2
1977	A' Ethniki	Olympiacos - Ethnikos	2–0
1977	A' Ethniki	Ethnikos - Olympiacos	1–3
1978	A' Ethniki	Olympiacos - Ethnikos	2–1
1978	A' Ethniki	Ethnikos - Olympiacos	1–1
1979	A' Ethniki	Olympiacos - Ethnikos	2–0
1979	A' Ethniki	Ethnikos - Olympiacos	0–1
1980	A' Ethniki	Olympiacos - Ethnikos	2–0
1980	A' Ethniki	Ethnikos - Olympiacos	1–2
1981	A' Ethniki	Olympiacos - Ethnikos	1–0
1981	A' Ethniki	Ethnikos - Olympiacos	0–2
1982	A' Ethniki	Olympiacos - Ethnikos	0–0
1982	A' Ethniki	Ethnikos - Olympiacos	0–1
1983	A' Ethniki	Olympiacos - Ethnikos	3–1
1983	A' Ethniki	Ethnikos - Olympiacos	1–3
1984	A' Ethniki	Olympiacos - Ethnikos	3–1
1984	A' Ethniki	Ethnikos - Olympiacos	1–2
1985	A' Ethniki	Olympiacos - Ethnikos	0–0
1985	A' Ethniki	Ethnikos - Olympiacos	1–3
1986	A' Ethniki	Olympiacos - Ethnikos	2–2
1986	A' Ethniki	Ethnikos - Olympiacos	2–0
1987	A' Ethniki	Olympiacos - Ethnikos	2–0
1987	A' Ethniki	Ethnikos - Olympiacos	0–2 (w/o)
1988	A' Ethniki	Olympiacos - Ethnikos	4–1
1988	A' Ethniki	Ethnikos - Olympiacos	0–0
1989	A' Ethniki	Olympiacos - Ethnikos	2–2
1989	A' Ethniki	Ethnikos - Olympiacos	0–3
1990	A' Ethniki	Olympiacos - Ethnikos	4–1
1990	A' Ethniki	Ethnikos - Olympiacos	0–1
1992	A' Ethniki	Olympiacos - Ethnikos	2–0
1992	A' Ethniki	Ethnikos - Olympiacos	1–1
1995	A' Ethniki	Olympiacos - Ethnikos	3–1
1995	A' Ethniki	Ethnikos - Olympiacos	0–1
1996	A' Ethniki	Olympiacos - Ethnikos	3–0
1996	A' Ethniki	Ethnikos - Olympiacos	0–3
1998	A' Ethniki	Olympiacos - Ethnikos	3–1
1998	A' Ethniki	Ethnikos - Olympiacos	1–3
1999	A' Ethniki	Olympiacos - Ethnikos	2–0
1999	A' Ethniki	Ethnikos - Olympiacos	0–3

==== Head to Head in the Greek cup ====
Year	Round	Winner	Score	Loser
1933	Semifinal	Ethnikos	2–1	Olympiacos
1940	Quarterfinal	Ethnikos	1–0	Olympiacos
1947	Quarterfinal	Olympiacos	2–0	Ethnikos
1969	Semifinal	Olympiacos	4–3 (aet)	Ethnikos
1976	Second round	Olympiacos	1–0	Ethnikos
1979	Second round	Olympiacos	1–0	Ethnikos
1984	Round of 16	Ethnikos Olympiacos	0–0 1–1^{1}	Olympiacos Ethnikos
1986	Quarterfinal	Olympiacos Ethnikos	3–1 0–1	Ethnikos Olympiacos
1987	First round	Olympiacos	2–1	Ethnikos

^{1} Ethnikos advanced through the away goals rule

=== Water polo ===
==== Summary of matches ====
Competition	Matches	630px seven vertical stripes HEX-ED1C24 and White	Draw	Five blue four white striped flag
Greek championship (1927–)	187	97	13	77
South Greece and Central Greece Championship (1932–1935, 1949–1964)	18	4	1	13
Greek Cup (1953–1958, 1984–)	20	9	1	10
Greek Supercup	1	1	0	0
Total	226	111	15	100

==== Higher finish in the championship (since 1949 when first division was introduced with points table) ====
Θ.	49	50	51	52	53	54	55	56	57	58	59	60	61	62	63	64	65	66	67	68	70	71	72	73	74	75	76	77	78	79	80	81	82	83	84	85
1	1		1	1	1	1	1	1	1	1	1	1	1	1	1	1	1	1	1	1	1	1	1	1	1	1	1	1	1	1	1	1	1	1	1	1
2	2	2		2	2						2	2			2	2	2	2	2	2	2	2	2	2	2	2	2	2	2	2						
3		3	3			3	3	3	3	3			3	3																	3	3	3	3	3	
4																																				
5																																				
6																																				6

Θ.	86	87	88	89	90	91	92	93	94	95	96	97	98	99	00	01	02	03	04	05	06	07	08	09	10	11	12	13	14	15	16	17	18	19	20	21	22	23	24
1			1				1	1	1	1	1			1	1	1	1	1	1	1	1	1	1	1	1	1		1	1	1	1	1	1	1	1	1	1	1	
2	2	2		2			2		2	2			2							2	2	2	2				2												
3				3	3	3		3				3				3	3	3																					
4		4				4					4																			4	4			4					
5					5										5				5														5						
6	6		6											6															6						6				
7																																					7	7	
8												8														8						8							
9													9																										
10																																							
11																								11															
12																											12												
13																																							
14																																				14			

- In 2010 and 2013 Ethnikos was playing in the second division
- In 1969 both teams were declared champions.
- Ethnikos 38 finished higher, Olympiacos 37 times (as of 2023–24 season)

==== List of official matches ====
- Red: Olympiacos win
- Blue: Ethnikos win

Date	Competition	Score	Score by halftime
14/09/1929	Greek Championship	1–3	
18/08/1930	Greek Championship	1–0	1–0, 0–0
15/08/1932	Southern Greece Championship	2–1	
10/09/1932	Greek Championship	3–1	2–0, 1–1
20/08/1933	Southern Greece Championship	2–1	0–1, 2–1
24/09/1933	Greek Championship	4–2	
20/08/1934	Southern Greece Championship	0–1	0–1, 0–0
16/09/1934	Greek Championship	4–2	3–1, 1–1
24/08/1935	Southern Greece Championship	2–1	1–0, 1–1
25/08/1935	Southern Greece Championship	1–2	1–2, 0–0
13/09/1936	Greek Championship	4–2	2–2, 2–0
18/09/1945	Greek Championship	1–0	
17/09/1945	Greek Championship	4–1	
07/10/1945	Nautical Games	1–2	
06/09/1946	Piraeus Rowing Club Cup	1–0	Suspended in favour of Olympiakos
14/09/1946	Greek Championship	4–2	
24/09/1948	Greek Championship	1–5	
09/08/1949	Central Greece Championship	2–0	Olympiakos won w/o
04/09/1949	Greek Championship	3–1	
23/09/1950	Greek Championship	4–3	
21/09/1951	Central Greece Championship	2–1	
06/08/1952	Central Greece Championship	1–5	0–3, 1–2
22/09/1952	Greek Championship	3–3	0–2, 3–1
20/08/1953	Central Greece Championship	1–4	0–3, 1–1
27/08/1953	Greek Cup	4–5	1–2, 2–1 (1–2 παρ.)
18/09/1953	Greek Championship	1–5	0–2, 1–3
20/08/1954	Central Greece Championship	2–4	
09/09/1954	Greek Cup	0–12	0–5, 0–7
15/09/1954	Greek Championship	2–5	0–4, 2–1
24/08/1955	Central Greece Championship	2–7	0–3, 2–4
31/08/1955	Greek Cup	2–6	1–3, 1–3
16/09/1955	Greek Championship	1–6	0–4, 1–2
17/08/1956	Central Greece Championship	3–5	2–4, 1–1
15/09/1956	Greek Championship	3–4	0–2, 3–2
17/08/1957	Central Greece Championship	2–4	2–2, 0–2
08/09/1957	Greek Cup	4–6	1–2, 3–2 (0–2 παρ.)
20/09/1957	Greek Championship	1–6	1–2, 0–4
14/09/1958	Greek Championship	5–6	2–3, 3–3
21/08/1959	Central Greece Championship	4–6	2–2, 2–4
13/09/1959	Greek Championship	3–4	1–2, 2–2
19/08/1960	Central Greece Championship	4–4	
26/08/1960	Central Greece Championship	2–3	0–2, 1–1
18/09/1960	Greek Championship	3–4	
15/09/1961	Greek Championship	2–5	0–3, 2–2
10/08/1962	Greek Championship	3–4	
22/08/1962	Central Greece Championship	3–4	1–2, 2–1 (0–1 παρ.)
08/09/1962	Greek Championship	3–4	0–2, 3–2
18/07/1963	Central Greece Championship	2–4	0–2, 2–2
09/08/1963	Greek Championship	3–10	2–4, 1–6
11/09/1963	Greek Championship	4–7	0–4, 4–3
07/08/1964	Greek Championship	5–4	2–2, 3–2
13/09/1964	Greek Championship	3–4	1–2, 2–2
14/09/1964	Greek Championship	1–2	0–2, 1–0
08/08/1965	Greek Championship	2–4	1–3, 1–1
05/09/1965	Greek Championship	0–0	0–0, 0–0
05/08/1966	Greek Championship	1–4	0–1, 1–3
10/09/1966	Greek Championship	2–3	
23/08/1967	Greek Championship	2–3	2–1, 0–2
20/09/1967	Greek Championship	3–3	1–0, 2–3
07/08/1968	Greek Championship	7–6	4–2, 3–4
06/09/1968	Greek Championship	5–7	1–4, 4–3
20/09/1969	Greek Championship	2–2	0–0, 2–2
23/07/1970	Greek Championship	3–3	2–1, 1–2
27/09/1970	Greek Championship	4–5	2–2, 2–3
26/04/1971	Greek Championship	4–5	2–2, 2–3
04/07/1971	Greek Championship	3–2	1–1, 2–1
05/07/1971	Greek Championship	3–3	1–1, 2–2
07/07/1971	Greek Championship	2–1	2–0, 0–1
23/04/1972	Greek Championship	4–3	3–2, 1–1
09/07/1972	Greek Championship	4–5	3–3, 1–2
10/07/1972	Greek Championship	5–6	1–2, 4–4
22/04/1973	Greek Championship	2–3	1–2, 1–1
15/07/1973	Greek Championship	6–5	3–3, 3–2
16/07/1973	Greek Championship	1–2	0–2, 1–0
14/07/1974	Greek Championship	1–3	1–1, 0–2
29/09/1974	Greek Championship	3–4	1–2, 2–2
09/07/1975	Greek Championship	4–6	1–2, 3–4
19/09/1975	Greek Championship	3–3	2–2, 1–1
16/08/1976	Greek Championship	1–4	1–2, 0–2
22/09/1976	Greek Championship	4–6	1–2, 3–4
05/06/1977	Greek Championship	6–1	3–0, 3–1
25/09/1977	Greek Championship	2–3	1–2, 1–1
26/09/1977	Greek Championship	0–5	Suspended in favour of Ethnikos
28/07/1978	Greek Championship	5–4	3–2, 2–2
01/10/1978	Greek Championship	5–6	2–3, 3–3
02/10/1978	Greek Championship	2–5	1–2, 1–3
26/05/1979	Greek Championship	4–4	2–1, 2–3
02/09/1979	Greek Championship	2–7	0–3, 2–4
26/08/1980	Greek Championship	3–4	1–2, 2–2
21/09/1980	Greek Championship	6–10	4–4, 2–6
27/05/1981	Greek Championship	5–11	3–5, 2–6
01/07/1981	Greek Championship	3–11	1–5, 2–6
12/05/1982	Greek Championship	2–9	1–2, 1–7
01/09/1982	Greek Championship	0–13	0–5, 0–8
11/06/1983	Greek Championship	6–11	2–5, 4–6
03/09/1983	Greek Championship	8–14	5–7, 3–7
27/05/1984	Greek Cup	6–10	4–3, 2–7
08/09/1984	Greek Championship	6–14	1–6, 5–8
29/09/1984	Greek Championship	4–8	0–3, 4–5
22/05/1985	Greek Championship	6–17	2–7, 4–10
11/09/1985	Greek Championship	10–13	5–6, 5–7
17/05/1986	Greek Championship	7–14	5–5, 2–9
28/08/1986	Greek Cup	5–8	3–4, 2–4
17/09/1986	Greek Championship	6–16	4–7, 2–9
07/02/1987	Greek Championship	3–5	0–2, 3–3
04/04/1987	Greek Championship	8–10	4–5, 4–5
19/03/1988	Greek Championship	3–5	3–2, 0–3
11/06/1988	Greek Championship	6–13	2–6, 4–7
21/01/1989	Greek Cup	7–10	
18/02/1989	Greek Championship	5–8	3–5, 2–3
27/03/1989	Greek Cup	8–11	5–5, 6–3
08/04/1989	Greek Championship	6–11	5–4, 1–7
04/04/1990	Greek Championship	8–9	4–6, 4–3
05/06/1990	Greek Championship	10–9	5–4, 5–5
12/06/1990	Greek Cup	10–7	
02/03/1991	Greek Championship	7–11	4–6, 3–5
11/05/1991	Greek Championship	19–8	8–5, 11–3
01/06/1991	Greek Championship	13–13	5–7, 8–6
15/06/1991	Greek Championship	14–10	6–6, 8–4
18/12/1991	Greek Championship	9–7	7–3, 2–4
01/06/1992	Greek Championship	12–14	9–8, 3–6
12/02/1992	Greek Cup	13–8	6–2, 7–6
26/02/1992	Greek Cup	10–10	4–7, 6–3
11/06/1992	Greek Championship	10–5	7–3, 3–2
18/06/1992	Greek Championship	9–12	
21/11/1992	Greek Championship	12–7	7–3, 5–4
03/02/1993	Greek Championship	11–11	7–5, 4–6
04/04/1993	Greek Championship	14–9	5–3, 9–6
10/04/1993	Greek Championship	8–6	2–4, 6–2
16/02/1994	Greek Championship	8–10	3–6, 5–4
30/03/1994	Greek Championship	4–4	2–1, 2–3
14/06/1994	Greek Championship	10–11	4–3, 6–8
16/06/1994	Greek Championship	10–9	4–3, 6–6
19/06/1994	Greek Championship	11–12	4–5, 4–3, (1–1 ext.) (2–3 pen.)
18/03/1995	Greek Championship	11–10	7–7, 4–3
20/05/1995	Greek Championship	8–12	5–7, 3–5
07/06/1995	Greek Championship	9–8	5–4, 4–4
09/06/1995	Greek Championship	10–9	6–3, 4–6
10/06/1995	Greek Championship	7–5	2–0, 5–5
02/12/1995	Greek Championship	10–10	5–8, 5–2
10/04/1996	Greek Championship	8–9	3–2, 5–7
18/12/1996	Greek Championship	11–10	6–4, 5–6
24/03/1997	Greek Championship	13–7	
21/03/1998	Greek Championship	14–5	8–4, 6–1
27/05/1998	Greek Championship	13–7	
15/11/1998	Greek Championship	9–8	5–6, 4–2
21/01/1999	Greek Championship	8–5	4–2, 4–3
05/01/2000	Greek Championship	6–4	1–2, 5–2
03/03/2000	Greek Cup	11–12	6–5, 5–6 (0–1 ext.)
27/05/2000	Greek Championship	13–7	6–3, 7–4
30/12/2000	Greek Championship	10–8	
14/03/2001	Greek Championship	13–11	6–4, 7–7
30/03/2001	Greek Cup	10–8	
18/04/2001	Greek Championship	7–5	
21/04/2001	Greek Championship	19–5	6–3, 13–2
02/12/2001	Greek Championship	14–8	8–6, 6–2
13/02/2002	Greek Championship	6–4	5–1, 1–3
30/03/2002	Greek Cup	11–8	6–5, 5–3
30/10/2002	Greek Championship	6–7	3–4, 3–3
08/01/2003	Greek Championship	9–1	4–0, 5–1
18/04/2003	Greek Championship	7–6	5–3, 2–3
20/04/2003	Greek Championship	9–4	6–1, 3–3
13/12/2003	Greek Championship	9–8	4–3, 5–5
10/03/2004	Greek Championship	7–8	5–4, 2–4
05/12/2004	Greek Championship	7–5	5–4, 2–1
26/02/2005	Greek Championship	5–6	2–3, 3–3
09/04/2005	Greek Cup	9–11	3–6, 6–5
04/05/2005	Greek Championship	17–16	1–1, 5–5, (2–2 ext., 9–8 pen.)
06/05/2005	Greek Championship	8–11	3–7, 5–4
08/05/2005	Greek Championship	8–7	7–2, 1–5
10/05/2005	Greek Championship	8–10	3–6, 5–4
11/05/2005	Greek Championship	11–6	5–2, 6–4
04/01/2006	Greek Championship	11–10	7–5, 4–5
11/03/2006	Greek Championship	9–9	3–5, 6–4
12/05/2006	Greek Championship	10–12	5–5, 5–5 (0–2 ext.)
14/05/2006	Greek Championship	8–6	3–3, 5–3
16/05/2006	Greek Championship	6–11	3–5, 3–6
18/05/2006	Greek Championship	8–6	5–3, 3–3
20/05/2006	Greek Championship	6–7	3–4, 3–2 (0–1 ext.)
13/12/2006	Greek Championship	9–7	3–2, 6–5
04/05/2007	Greek Championship	8–6	4–1, 4–5
20/05/2007	Greek Cup	11–5	7–2, 4–3
09/06/2007	Greek Championship	7–6	4–5, 3–1
12/06/2007	Greek Championship	11–13	5–5, 5–5, (1–3 ext.)
14/06/2007	Greek Championship	11–9	7–3, 4–6
16/06/2007	Greek Championship	8–7	4–2, 4–5
14/11/2007	Greek Championship	13–10	8–4, 5–6
02/02/2008	Greek Championship	12–5	7–2, 5–3
04/04/2008	Greek Cup	12–8	8–2, 5–6
21/04/2008	Greek Championship	10–5	4–4, 6–1
23/04/2008	Greek Championship	12–9	5–6, 7–3
30/04/2008	Greek Championship	5–7	3–4, 2–3
02/05/2008	Greek Championship	8–5	4–2, 5–3
10/01/2009	Greek Championship	9–8	4–4, 5–4
28/03/2009	Greek Championship	10–4	6–3, 4–1
12/01/2011	Greek Championship	16–3	7–1, 9–2
06/04/2011	Greek Championship	20–3	7–1, 13–2
12/11/2011	Greek Championship	20–3	9–1, 11–2
03/03/2012	Greek Championship	12–2	8–1, 4–1
15/12/2013	Greek Championship	15–4	6–2, 9–2
05/03/2014	Greek Championship	21–6	10–4, 11–2
19/03/2014	Greek Cup	18–5	11–2, 7–3
22/11/2014	Greek Championship	15–4	8–2, 7–2
13/02/2015	Greek Championship	15–4	4–3, 11–1
12/12/2015	Greek Championship	15–5	8–2, 7–3
27/03/2016	Greek Championship	16–4	9–2, 7–2
20/04/2016	Greek Championship	13–7	6–3, 7–4
22/04/2016	Greek Championship	13–5	5–1, 8–4
05/11/2016	Greek Championship	11–5	5–3, 6–2
01/02/2017	Greek Championship	21–2	11–1, 10–1
21/10/2017	Greek Championship	16–7	8–2, 8–5
27/01/2018	Greek Championship	16–7	8–3, 8–4
21/02/2018	Greek Cup	9–2	6–1, 3–1
05/01/2019	Greek Championship	15–7	5–2, 10–5
10/04/2019	Greek Championship	19–7	9–2, 10–5
08/05/2019	Greek Championship	10–3	6–1, 4–2
10/05/2019	Greek Championship	19–6	10–3, 9–3
23/11/2019	Greek Championship	24–6	12-2, 12-4
29/02/2020	Greek Cup	18–6	7–4, 11–2
01/07/2020	Greek Championship	20–6	8–3, 12–3
03/10/2020	Greek Super Cup	21–6	12–5, 9–1
27/03/2021	Greek Championship	18–4	7–1, 11–3
23/11/2021	Greek Championship	16–3	7–1, 9–2
05/02/2022	Greek Championship	14–4	3–4, 11–0
12/11/2022	Greek Championship	17–6	10–1, 7–5
14/01/2023	Greek Championship	16–4	7–2, 9–2

=== Biggest win ===
For Olympiacos
Stage	Competition	Score	Year	Margin (min.)
Greek Championship		21–2	2017	+19 (32')
Quarterfinal	Greek Cup	18–5	2014	+13 (32')
Biggest offensive performance
Greek Championship		24–6	2020	+18 (32')

For Ethnikos
Stage	Competition	Score	Year	Margin (min.)
Greek Championship		13–0	1982	+13 (28')
Final	Greek Cup	12–0	1954	+12 (20')
Biggest offensive performance
Greek Championship		17–6	1985	+11 (28')

=== Top 10 scorers ===
Pos	Player	Goals	Team Played for (Goals)
1	Thodoris Chatzitheodorou	95	Olympiakos (95)
4	Antonis Aronis	80	Ethnikos (61), Olympiakos (19)
2	Antonis Vlontakis	77	Ethnikos (47), Olympiakos (30)
3	Thodoris Kalakonas	76	Ethnikos (73), Olympiakos (3)
5	Giannis Fountoulis	72	Olympiakos (72)
6	Nondas Samartzidis	68	Ethnikos (68)
7	Andreas Garyfallos	65	Ethnikos (65)
8	Giorgos Ntoskas	58	Olympiakos (58)
9	Nikos Venetopoulos	57	Olympiakos (57)
10	Manolis Mylonakis	56	Ethnikos (33), Olympiakos (23)

=== Head to Head matches with title on the line (Final matches) ===
Date	Competition	Phase	Result
31/07/1927	Greek National Championship	Final	3 – 2
14/08/1932	Southern Greece Championship	Final	2 – 1
20/08/1933	Southern Greece Championship	Final	2 – 1
24/09/1933	Greek National Championship	Final	4 – 2
16/09/1934	Greek National Championship	Final	4 – 2
07/10/1945	Piraeus Nautical Games	Final	2 – 1
06/09/1946	Piraeus Rowing Club Cup	Final	1 – 0*
06/08/1952	Central Greece Championship	Final	5 – 1
20/08/1953	Central Greece Championship	Final	4 – 1
27/08/1953	Men's Greek Cup	Final	5 – 4 (ext.); 3 – 3
19/08/1954	Central Greece Championship	Final	4 – 2
09/09/1954	Men's Greek Cup	Final	12 – 0
24/08/1955	Central Greece Championship	Final	7 – 2
18/08/1956	Central Greece Championship	Final	5 – 3
16/08/1957	Central Greece Championship	Final	4 – 2
08/09/1957	Men's Greek Cup	Final	6 – 4 (ext.); 4 – 4
20/08/1959	Central Greece Championship	Final	6 – 4
13/09/1959	Greek National Championship	Title Match (both tied at the table)	4 – 3
26/08/1960	Central Greece Championship	Final	3 – 2
18/09/1960	Greek National Championship	Title Match (both tied at the table)	4 – 3
22/08/1962	Central Greece Championship	Final	4 – 3 (ext.)
18/07/1963	Central Greece Championship	Final	4 – 2
14/09/1964	Greek National Championship	Title Match (both tied at the table)	2 – 1
27/09/1970	Greek National Championship	Title Match (both tied at the table)	5 – 4
07/07/1971	Greek National Championship	Second Title Match (tied at the table, first title match ended as a tie)	2 – 1
10/07/1972	Greek National Championship	Title Match (both tied at the table)	6 – 5
16/07/1973	Greek National Championship	Title Match (both tied at the table)	2 – 1
26/09/1977	Greek National Championship	Title Match (both tied at the table)	5 – 0**
02/10/1978	Greek National Championship	Title Match (both tied at the table)	5 – 2
02/09/1979	Greek National Championship	Title Match (both tied at the table)	7 – 2
19/06/1994	Greek National Championship	Last Finals Game (1–1 series tied, best of 3)	12 – 11 (pen.); 9 – 9 (ext.)
03/03/2000	Men's Greek Cup	Final	12 – 11 (ext.); 11 – 11
11/05/2005	Greek National Championship	Last Finals Game (2–2 series tied, best of 5)	11 – 6
20/05/2006	Greek National Championship	Last Finals Game (2–2 series tied, best of 5)	7 – 6 (ext.); 6 – 6
20/05/2007	Men's Greek Cup	Final	11 – 5
29/02/2020	Men's Greek Cup	Final	18 – 6
03/10/2020	Men's Greek Super Cup	Final	21 – 6
17/12/2022	Women's European Super Cup	Final	11 – 4
11/5/2024	Women's Greek Cup	Final	13 – 11 (pen.); 9 – 9 (ext.)

* Match was suspended in favor of Olympiacos

** Olympiacos abandoned the game after 1 min 25 sec since the start of it due to protest for the exclusion of its players after serious incidentsbetween Olympiacos and Ethnikos players.

== Honours (Football) ==
=== Total honour comparison ===
Competition	Olympiacos	Ethnikos
UEFA Europa Conference League	1	0
Balkans Cup	1	0
Greek National Championship	48	0
Greek Cup	29	1
Greek Super Cup	5	0
Greek Second Division Championship	0	1
Piraeus Regional Championship	25	6
Piraeus Regional Cup	0	4
Total	109	12

== Honours (Water polo) ==
=== Total honour comparison ===
Competition	Olympiacos	Ethnikos
LEN Champions League (Men's)	2	0
LEN Champions League (Women's)	3	0
LEN Trophy (Women's)	1	2
LEN Super Cup (Men's)	1	0
LEN Super Cup (Women's)	3	0
Greek National Championship (Men's)	40	38
Greek National Championship (Women's)	16	3
Greek Cup (Men's)	27	12
Greek Cup (Women's)	7	1
Greek Second Tier Championship (Men's)	0	1
Greek Second Tier Championship (Women's)	1	0
Greek Third Tier Championship (Women's)	1	0
Southern Greece – Central Greece Federation's Championship	6	11
Greek Super Cup (Men's)	5	0
Greek Super Cup (Women's)	3	0
Total	116	68

== The Piraeus derby in European competition ==
In 2021, Olympiacos and Ethnikos hosted the Group F of LEN Euroleague, Europe's most prestigious club competition for women's waterpolo. All matches were held at the Piraeus National Swimming Pool. Both clubs from Piraeus advanced to the quarterfinals of the competition. The first ever “European” Piraeus derby ended 9–5 in favour of Olympiacos. At the end of the season Olympiacos won the LEN Euroleague and Ethnikos the LEN Trophy. The two city clubs will contest the European Super Cup for the 2022 season. It was the first time two clubs from the same city will compete in any team sport for the European Super Cup trophy in Greek sports history. Olympiacos won the match 11–4.

=== Final standings ===
Pos.	Club	Pts	W	D	L	GF	GA	GD
1	(Greece) Olympiacos	9	3	0	0	35	18	+17
2	(Greece) Ethnikos	6	2	0	1	27	21	+6
3	(Spain) Terrassa	3	1	0	2	24	26	-2
4	(Italy) Roma	0	0	0	3	20	41	-21
