= Ioannis Garifallos =

Greek water polo player

Personal information
- Born: September 15, 1957 (age 67); Athens, Greece

Sport
- Sport: Water polo

Ioannis Garifallos (born 15 September 1957) is a Greek former water polo player who competed in the 1980 Summer Olympics. He played for Greek powerhouse Ethnikos Piraeus. He is the son of “Patriarch of Greek water polo” Andreas Garyfallos. He played in the 70s and 80s winning 16 Greek championships (14 consecutive) with his childhood club Ethnikos.

== Titles ==
Greek championship (16): 1969, 1970, 1972, 1973, 1974, 1975, 1976, 1977, 1978, 1979, 1980, 1981, 1982, 1983, 1984, 1985

Greek cup (2): 1984, 1985
