= Ethnikos Piraeus Water Polo Club =

Water polo team

Ethnikos Piraeus Water Polo
- Nickname: ‘‘Εmperor’’
- Founded: 21 November 1923
- League: A1 Ethniki Water Polo
- Based in: Piraeus, Greece
- Arena: Papastrateio Pool, Pireaus
- Colors: Blue, White
- President: Ioannis Patlakas
- Head coach: Men; Fanis Kountoudios; Women; Stefanos Leandros
- Championships: Men's team 38 Greek Championships; 12 Greek Cups; 11 Central Greece Water Polo Championship; Women's team 2 Women's LEN Trophy; 3 Greek Championships; 1 Greek Cup
- Website: ethnikoswaterpolo.gr

Ethnikos Piraeus Water Polo Club is the professional water polo team of Ethnikos OFPF (meaning: National Club of Fans of Piraeus and Phalerum, in Greek: Εθνικός Όμιλος Φιλάθλων Πειραιώς Φαλήρου).

Ethnikos is one of the most successful and traditional water polo clubs in Greece. They held (from 22/9/1957 up to 23/5/2025) the record for the most Greek water polo championships with 38. They have alson won 12 Greek water polo cups achieving 9 times the Double and 11 times the Central Greece Championship. Ethnikos has the unique record of winning 18 championships in a row (from 1953 to 1970) and the second most with 14 in a row (from 1972 to 1985). Ethnikos holds the unique record for the most unbeaten championships with 29 (from which 11 are consecutive, which is also a record) and the record for consecutive years staying unbeaten in a domestic match (13 years, from September 1951 to August 1964). Also, the club holds the record for most championships won exclusively with wins (19, 10 of which are consecutive, also a record).

The dominance of Ethnikos along with his longstanding records led to his given nickname, the “Emperor”.

The men's team was the first Greek club to reach the eight (1966) and four (1980) best teams in Europe. The team has been in the top-8 teams in Europe another eight times (1970, 1972, 1977, 1978, 1979, 1981, 1983, 1995).

The women's team won the LEN Trophy in 2010 and repeated its triumph in 2022 to become the Greek team with the most LEN Trophies.

Many great players have played for Ethnikos throughout the years. The Greece men's national water polo team for many years consisted of Ethnikos players that have participated in the Olympics. The greatest personality in the history of the club is Andreas Garifallos, player, coach and president. In the Kastella neighborhood of Piraeus, the swimming pool bears his name in honour of his contribution to Piraeus and Greece water polo. Other great players that have played for Ethnikos are Ioannis Garifallos, Giannis Karalogos, Thomas Karalogos, Nondas Samartzidis, Kyriakos Iosifidis, Markellos Sitarenios, Sotirios Stathakis, Evangelos Patras, Konstantinos Kokkinakis, Filippos Kaiafas, Theodoros Kalakonas, Dimitrios Mazis, Christos Afroudakis, Antonios Aronis, Dimitrios Konstas, Dimitrios Kougevetopoulos, Antonios Vlontakis, Gerasimos Voltirakis, Anastasios Schizas, Chris Humbert, Wolf Wigo, Ashleigh Johnson, Iefke van Belkum, Stephania Haralabidis, Ioanna Haralabidis, Maria Tsouri, Aikaterini Oikonomopoulou, Sofia Iosifidou, Marina Canetti

== Men's team ==
=== Summary ===
Ethnikos dominated in Greek Water Polo championship for decades. During last years its power has been limited, and it has been relegated to the second division (A2 Ethniki) twice in 2009 and 2012. In 1980, Ethnikos became the first Greek team to reach the Final-4 of LEN Champions League (the elite European club competition). Besides that, Ethnikos has reached the final-8 nine times. In 2003 the team took the third place in LEN Trophy (second tier European club competition). The club has an eternal rivalry with Olympiacos, the other club from Piraeus. The match between the two is dubbed as the “Piraeus derby”. Ethnikos had won six consecutive Greek cups (four of them against Olympiacos in the final) before the competition had a hiatus of 25 years that stopped Ethnikos from winning many more trophies and achieving more doubles.

=== 1925–1940 (Pre WWII years) ===
The club's first championship was won in 1926 under SEGAS with Ethnikos winning it undefeated with four wins in as many matches against N.O. Kastellas, Iraklis Thessaloniki, Aris Thessaloniki and Panionios Smyrna.

On July 31, 1927 Ethnikos was defeated in the final by Olympiakos 3–2 in a match that he appealed for a late goal scored by its opponent which led to extra time. The referee canceled the match as the timekeepers had tried to inform him of the end of the match (after all the score was at the time 2–1 in favor of Ethnikos). A replay was set for the third day of August but never took place. After days and meetings of the sports department of SEGAS with representatives of the two teams, a rematch is set to take place on the 16th of August. In the end, this match will not take place either, since Olympiacos insists on the opinion that they won the match, so it should be declared champion, while the Ethnikos side, since they are not given the title, since they consider that the match was over before Olympiacos equalized, agreed to play a replay match. On the 16th of the same month a meeting was held, where the Board of Directors of SEGAS cancelled the referee's decision to cancel the match on the 31st of July, and declares Olympiacos champion without a playoff match.

The first championship after the establishment of KOE (National Swimming Federation) came in 1931 with Ethnikos conquering it again undefeated by defeating the then three-time consecutive champion Aris Thessaloniki in the final with 1–0. The 1931 team consisted of Petroutsos, Dede, Perdikis, Mavrogeorgos, Makris, Stephopoulos, Hatzigeorgiou. The leading player of the team was Petroutsos, one of the leading pre-war swimmers along with Zografos of Aris and Provatopoulos of Olympiakos. Ethnikos on its way to the final beat P.A.O.K. (6–0), Iraklis Thessaloniki (3–1) and NO Patras in the semi-final (3–0).

In 1932, Ethnikos will not be able to defend its title since the federation will expel Ethnikos and Olympiakos from the championship due to major incidents in the match between them.

In 1933 and 1934 Ethnikos will lose the title in the final to Olympiakos (4–2 the score in both years) while in 1935 he will not participate in the games in Mytilini due to his punishment by KOE for not playing the decisive play-off match with Olympiakos for the final qualification ticket.

In 1936 and 1938 he will lose to Olympiakos in the first round and will be eliminated from the competition (then the championship had a knock out system).

In 1937, he will come second again, losing 3–2 in the final to NO Patras despite leading at halftime with 1–0.

In 1940 he will be defeated by KO Piraeus (1–0) in the first match and will be eliminated.

=== 1945–1952 (First post WWII years) ===
In the years 1945 and 1946 he will be ranked third. In 1945, he was eliminated after losing (4–1) to Olympiacos, while in 1946 he lost 4–2 to Olympiakos and 3–2 to the eventual champion NO Patras.

The third championship came 17 years after the second, in 1948, with Ethnikos winning it undefeated (wins over NO Patras 5–0, Aris 1–0, Olympiakos 5–1, NAO Kerkyra 5–0, NO Chalkida 7–2 and a draw against NO Mytilinis, 2–2). The coach of the team was Takis Sakellariou who played a modern and fast water polo in contrast to Olympiakos and NO Patras who played a physical and with less movement water polo.

In 1949, Ethnikos would lose the championship due to a draw with Palaio Faliro and a 3–1 loss to Olympiakos in a match where they played without their big gun, Andreas Garifallos due to injury.

In 1950, he lost to NO Patras and Olympiakos, finishing third.

In 1951 he would lose the title due to his defeat by Olympiakos with 2–1, while in 1952 he was very close to the title but the victory of Olympiakos with 3–2 over NO Patras combined with the draw of Ethnikos with the team from Patras (2–2) and the "suicide" of Ethnikos in the match against Olympiakos (3–3) while leading at half-time with 2–0, will lead the title to the "red and whites".

=== 1953–1986 (Domestic Dynasty) ===
In the following season, Ethnikos started his dynasty and won the championship undefeated for the first time after 5 years, achieving 4 wins and 1 draw in 5 games (3–3 with P. Faliro, victory over Mytilini, 10–1 victory over Achilleas Patras, 10–3 over Aris and 5–1 over Olympiakos on 18/9/1953 in front of an audience of 5,000 spectators at the Zappeion Olympic swimming pool).

From 1953 to 1963, the blue and whites of Piraeus won 11 consecutive undefeated championships, a record that has not happened in any other sport. In the period 1953 to 1958 he won six consecutive cups before the competition discontinued.

During the 1950s, he began a long unbeaten streak in league games, which lasted 13 years, a record that remains to this day. In particular, after losing 2–1 to Olympiakos on September 21, 1951, they were defeated again by the same opponent on August 7, 1964 with 5–4. In between he remained unbeaten in 75 matches, where he won 71 while 4 ended in draws. The last draw was recorded in a match against Palaio Faliro on September 19, 1953. After this match, a winning streak began, which lasted for 11 years and 64 league matches until the defeat in 1964.

The 115 consecutive unbeaten domestic matches (including Central Championship and Greek Cup matches) were:

No	Date	Ethnikos	Score	Opponent	Competition
1	22/9/1951	Ethnikos Piraeus	**6–4**	Paleo Faliro	Greek National Championship
2	23/9/1951	Ethnikos Piraeus	**2–2**	NO Mytilene	Greek National Championship
3	6/8/1952	Ethnikos Piraeus	**5–1**	Olympiacos Piraeus	Central Championship
4	18/9/1952	Ethnikos Piraeus	**2–2**	NO Patras	Greek National Championship
5	19/9/1952	Ethnikos Piraeus	**4–3**	NO Mytilene	Greek National Championship
6	20/9/1952	Ethnikos Piraeus	**4–2**	Paleo Faliro	Greek National Championship
7	21/9/1952	Ethnikos Piraeus	**5–2**	Aris Thessaloniki	Greek National Championship
8	22/9/1952	Ethnikos Piraeus	**3–3**	Olympiacos Piraeus	Greek National Championship
9	2/8/1953	Ethnikos Piraeus	**8–0**	Chalkis	Greek Cup
10	15/8/1953	Ethnikos Piraeus	**6–1**	Aris Thessaloniki	Greek Cup
11	20/8/1953	Ethnikos Piraeus	**4–1**	Olympiacos Piraeus	Central Championship
12	26/8/1953	Ethnikos Piraeus	**9–0**	EGO Heraklion	Greek Cup
13	27/8/1953	Ethnikos Piraeus	**5–4 ext (3–3)**	Olympiacos Piraeus	Greek Cup
14	17/9/1953	Ethnikos Piraeus	**10–3**	Aris Thessaloniki	Greek National Championship
15	18/9/1953	Ethnikos Piraeus	**5–1**	Olympiacos Piraeus	Greek National Championship
16	19/9/1953	Ethnikos Piraeus	**2–0 (w/o)**	NO Mytilene	Greek National Championship
17	19/9/1953	Ethnikos Piraeus	**3–3**	Paleo Faliro	Greek National Championship
18	20/9/1953	Ethnikos Piraeus	**10–1**	Achilles Patras	Greek National Championship
19	18/8/1954	Ethnikos Piraeus	**5–3 ext (2–2)**	Paleo Faliro	Central Championship
20	19/8/1954	Ethnikos Piraeus	**4–2**	Olympiacos Piraeus	Central Championship
21	5/9/1954	Ethnikos Piraeus	**8–2**	Achilles Patras	Greek Cup
22	8/9/1954	Ethnikos Piraeus	**6–2**	Paleo Faliro	Greek Cup
23	9/9/1954	Ethnikos Piraeus	**12–0**	Olympiacos Piraeus	Greek Cup
24	15/9/1954	Ethnikos Piraeus	**5–2**	Olympiacos Piraeus	Greek National Championship
25	16/9/1954	Ethnikos Piraeus	**5–4**	NO Patras	Greek National Championship
26	17/9/1954	Ethnikos Piraeus	**10–0**	Aris Thessaloniki	Greek National Championship
27	18/9/1954	Ethnikos Piraeus	**9–2**	Paleo Faliro	Greek National Championship
28	19/9/1954	Ethnikos Piraeus	**2–0 (w/o)**	Achilles Patras	Greek National Championship
29	14/8/1955	Ethnikos Piraeus	?	NO Mytilene	Greek Cup
30	23/8/1955	Ethnikos Piraeus	**10–1**	Ethnikos Athens	Central Championship
31	24/8/1955	Ethnikos Piraeus	**7–2**	Olympiacos Piraeus	Central Championship
32	31/8/1955	Ethnikos Piraeus	**6–2**	Olympiacos Piraeus	Greek Cup
33	1/9/1955	Ethnikos Piraeus	**1–0 (suspended in favor of Ethnikos)**	Aris Thessaloniki	Greek Cup
34	14/9/1955	Ethnikos Piraeus	**4–1**	NO Mytilene	Greek National Championship
35	16/9/1955	Ethnikos Piraeus	**6–1**	Olympiacos Piraeus	Greek National Championship
36	17/9/1955	Ethnikos Piraeus	**6–3**	Paleo Faliro	Greek National Championship
37	17/9/1955	Ethnikos Piraeus	**7–1**	Achilles Patras	Greek National Championship
38	18/9/1955	Ethnikos Piraeus	**4–2**	NO Patras	Greek National Championship
39	25/7/1956	Ethnikos Piraeus	;	Chalkis	Greek Cup
40	7/8/1956	Ethnikos Piraeus	**8–2**	EGO Heraklion	Greek Cup
41	15/8/1956	Ethnikos Piraeus	**7–1**	Ethnikos Athens	Central Championship
42	17/8/1956	Ethnikos Piraeus	**5–3**	Olympiacos Piraeus	Central Championship
43	22/8/1956	Ethnikos Piraeus	**6–1**	Aris Thessaloniki	Greek Cup
44	23/8/1956	Ethnikos Piraeus	**6–3**	Paleo Faliro	Greek Cup
45	24/8/1956	Ethnikos Piraeus	**4–3**	NO Patras	Greek Cup
46	10/9/1956	Ethnikos Piraeus	**9–1**	Ethnikos Athens	Greek National Championship
47	12/9/1956	Ethnikos Piraeus	**6–0**	Paleo Faliro	Greek National Championship
48	13/9/1956	Ethnikos Piraeus	**7–0**	NO Mytilene	Greek National Championship
49	14/9/1956	Ethnikos Piraeus	**5–1**	Achilles Patras	Greek National Championship
50	15/9/1956	Ethnikos Piraeus	**4–3**	Olympiacos Piraeus	Greek National Championship
51	16/9/1956	Ethnikos Piraeus	**3–2**	NO Patras	Greek National Championship
52	28/7/1957	Ethnikos Piraeus	**4–2**	Achilles Patras	Greek Cup
53	16/8/1957	Ethnikos Piraeus	**4–1**	Paleo Faliro	Central Championship
54	17/8/1957	Ethnikos Piraeus	**4–2**	Olympiacos Piraeus	Central Championship
55	6/9/1957	Ethnikos Piraeus	**9–4**	Paleo Faliro	Greek Cup
56	8/9/1957	Ethnikos Piraeus	**6–4 ext (4–4)**	Olympiacos Piraeus	Greek Cup
57	19/9/1957	Ethnikos Piraeus	**10–1**	NO Mytilene	Greek National Championship
58	20/9/1957	Ethnikos Piraeus	**6–1**	Olympiacos Piraeus	Greek National Championship
59	21/9/1957	Ethnikos Piraeus	**6–2**	Paleo Faliro	Greek National Championship
60	22/9/1957	Ethnikos Piraeus	**9–1**	Paleo Faliro	Greek National Championship
61	10/9/1958	Ethnikos Piraeus	**10–5**	Achilles Patras	Greek National Championship
62	11/9/1958	Ethnikos Piraeus	**9–1**	NO Mytilene	Greek National Championship
63	12/9/1958	Ethnikos Piraeus	**8–2**	Aris Thessaloniki	Greek National Championship
64	14/9/1958	Ethnikos Piraeus	**6–5**	Olympiacos Piraeus	Greek National Championship
65	14/9/1958	Ethnikos Piraeus	**6–2**	NO Patras	Greek National Championship
66	17/9/1958	Ethnikos Piraeus	**2–0 (w/o)**	Aris Salonica or Achilles Patras	Greek Cup
67	18/9/1958	Ethnikos Piraeus	**5–2**	NO Patras	Greek Cup
68	19/8/1959	Ethnikos Piraeus	**11–0**	Ethnikos Athens	Central Championship
69	20/8/1959	Ethnikos Piraeus	**6–4**	Olympiacos Piraeus	Central Championship
70	9/9/1959	Ethnikos Piraeus	**11–4**	Paleo Faliro	Greek National Championship
71	10/9/1959	Ethnikos Piraeus	**11–4**	Aris Thessaloniki	Greek National Championship
72	11/9/1959	Ethnikos Piraeus	**6–1**	NO Mytilene	Greek National Championship
73	11/9/1959	Ethnikos Piraeus	**7–2**	Achilles Patras	Greek National Championship
74	12/9/1959	Ethnikos Piraeus	**5–1**	NO Patras	Greek National Championship
75	13/9/1959	Ethnikos Piraeus	**4–3**	Olympiacos Piraeus	Greek National Championship
76	19/8/1960	Ethnikos Piraeus	**4–4**	Olympiacos Piraeus	Central Championship
77	26/8/1960	Ethnikos Piraeus	**3–2**	Olympiacos Piraeus	Replay Central Championship
78	14/9/1960	Ethnikos Piraeus	**11–1**	Achilles Patras	Greek National Championship
79	15/9/1960	Ethnikos Piraeus	**6–4**	NO Mytilene	Greek National Championship
80	16/9/1960	Ethnikos Piraeus	**11–1**	Aris Thessaloniki	Greek National Championship
81	17/9/1960	Ethnikos Piraeus	**3–2**	NO Patras	Greek National Championship
82	18/9/1960	Ethnikos Piraeus	**4–3**	Olympiacos Piraeus	Greek National Championship
83	17/8/1961	Ethnikos Piraeus	**1–1**	Olympiacos Piraeus	Central Championship
83	17/8/1961	Ethnikos Piraeus	**suspended in favor of Ethnikos**	Olympiacos Piraeus	Central Championship
84	18/8/1961	Ethnikos Piraeus	**10–1**	Paleo Faliro	Central Championship
85	13/9/1961	Ethnikos Piraeus	**13–2**	NO Mytilene	Greek National Championship
86	14/9/1961	Ethnikos Piraeus	**8–1**	Paleo Faliro	Greek National Championship
87	15/9/1961	Ethnikos Piraeus	**5–2**	Olympiacos Piraeus	Greek National Championship
88	16/9/1961	Ethnikos Piraeus	**10–5**	Patraikos	Greek National Championship
89	17/9/1961	Ethnikos Piraeus	**6–5**	NO Patras	Greek National Championship
90	8/8/1962	Ethnikos Piraeus	**10–0**	Panathinaikos	Greek National Championship
91	9/8/1962	Ethnikos Piraeus	**11–0**	Paleo Faliro	Greek National Championship
92	10/8/1962	Ethnikos Piraeus	**4–3**	Olympiacos Piraeus	Greek National Championship
93	11/8/1962	Ethnikos Piraeus	**6–5**	NO Patras	Greek National Championship
94	12/8/1962	Ethnikos Piraeus	**11–3**	NO Mytilene	Greek National Championship
95	21/8/1962	Ethnikos Piraeus	**7–0**	Paleo Faliro	Central Championship
96	22/8/1962	Ethnikos Piraeus	**4–3 ext (3–3)**	Olympiacos Piraeus	Central Championship
97	5/9/1962	Ethnikos Piraeus	**10–2**	Panathinaikos	Greek National Championship
98	6/9/1962	Ethnikos Piraeus	**10–0**	NO Mytilene	Greek National Championship
99	7/9/1962	Ethnikos Piraeus	**4–3**	Olympiacos Piraeus	Greek National Championship
100	8/9/1962	Ethnikos Piraeus	**5–3**	NO Patras	Greek National Championship
101	9/9/1962	Ethnikos Piraeus	**7–5**	Paleo Faliro	Greek National Championship
102	19/7/1963	Ethnikos Piraeus	**4–2**	Olympiacos Piraeus	Central Championship
103	7/8/1963	Ethnikos Piraeus	**9–3**	Panathinaikos	Greek National Championship
104	8/8/1963	Ethnikos Piraeus	**8–2**	NO Mytilene	Greek National Championship
105	9/8/1963	Ethnikos Piraeus	**10–3**	Olympiacos Piraeus	Greek National Championship
106	10/8/1963	Ethnikos Piraeus	**6–2**	PAOK	Greek National Championship
107	11/8/1963	Ethnikos Piraeus	**6–4**	NO Patras	Greek National Championship
108	10/9/1963	Ethnikos Piraeus	**8–1**	PAOK	Greek National Championship
109	11/9/1963	Ethnikos Piraeus	**7–4**	Olympiacos Piraeus	Greek National Championship
110	13/9/1963	Ethnikos Piraeus	**5–1**	NO Patras	Greek National Championship
111	14/9/1963	Ethnikos Piraeus	**8–2**	NO Mytilene	Greek National Championship
112	15/9/1963	Ethnikos Piraeus	**6–3**	Panathinaikos	Greek National Championship
113	15/7/1963	Ethnikos Piraeus	**10–0**	Paleo Faliro	Central Championship
114	5/8/1964	Ethnikos Piraeus	**9–0**	Panathinaikos	Greek National Championship
115	6/8/1964	Ethnikos Piraeus	**6–0**	NO Patras	Greek National Championship

This group consisted of Andreas Garifallos, Petros Kalfamanolis, Mimi Georgiadis, Yiannis Thymaras, Manolis Patlakas, Dimitris Kourantis, Nikos Lekakis, Kalomiris, Andreadis, Petros Chatzikyriakakis, Panagiotis Chatzikyriakakis, Panagiotis Takousis.

In 1965, 1966 and 1967 he won the championship without defeat. In 1966 he would do the maximum with 10 wins in 10 matches, in 1965 9 wins and a draw with Olympiakos (0–0) while in 1967 he will score 4 wins and 2 draws (3–3 with OSFP and PAO) in 6 matches.

On 7/8/1968, exactly four years and 34 consecutive unbeaten matches after their last defeat in Greece, he loses to Olympiakos in the first round (7–6) but beats him in the second (7–5, with five goals from Garyfallos) in order to win the championship with the best goal difference. The championship would be decided in the matches of the two Piraeus teams against NOP in the second round. OSFP will win hard 9-7 while Ethnikis will win 11-3. At the end of the championship, Andreas Garifallos retires as a water polo player and continues his work in Greek water polo as a coach.

In the 1969 championship, according to the press of the time, the final between Olympiacos and Ethnikos never took place because Olympiacos did not compete due to the death of its president Kostas Bouzakis. The two teams were named "co-champions" (they had four wins in five games while the derby match between them ended 2–2).

In 1970 Ethnikos will win the championship undefeated with only one draw against Olympiakos. This was the 18th championship in a row and the last before Olympiacos breaks the streak.

In 1971, the team would lose the title for the first time since 1952 due to a loss to Olympiakos in the second play-off match (2–1). Nevertheless, he would continue a new series of championships from 1972 until 1985. During this time, he would win the championships of 1974, 1975, 1976 and 1979 without defeat. In fact, he built a new streak of almost four years without defeat since from 15/7/1973 until his loss on 5/6/1977.

Also, from 28/07/1978 and the 5–4 defeat by Olympiakos until its defeat on 05/06/1990 with 10–9 again by Olympiakos, Ethnikos was undefeated against compatriot Olympiakos in 29 consecutive matches (League and Cup, the last draw coming in 1979, 4–4) while on September 1, 1982, in the second round of the championship, he beat Olympiakos 0–13 (in 28 minutes, four 7 minute quarters).

In the 1980s, Ethnikos had Glyfada as their rival after Olympiacos had lost the power of the previous decades.

In 1981, the first year that the duration of the games was increased from 20 to 28 minutes (four seven-minute periods, instead of the four five-minute periods), Ethnikos will destroy most of its opponents with the exception of Glyfada. Indicative are the 11–3 and 11–5 victories over Olympiakos, 13–3 and 12–4 over PAO, 21–0 over Palaio Faliro, 22-–1 over Chios, 19–2 and 23–0 over Vouliagmeni, while the 1982 will beat OSFP with 9–2 and 13–0, Patras with 20–2 and 16–6, NOB with 15–7 and 15–3, PAO with 14–7, PAOK with 17–5 and Volos with 22-4.

In the 1980s, Ethnikos managed to remain unbeaten in the Greek league for almost six years and 101 consecutive league matches and including cup matches of the seasons 1983–84, 1984–85, for a total of 109 matches. In particular, after losing the penultimate matchday of the 1980 championship against Glyfada 3–5 on September 27, 1980, he was defeated again on May 10, 1986 by Vouliagmeni 7–8 in a game in which Ethnikis appealed for a late goal of Vouliagmeni. In between he won 5 consecutive unbeaten championships (1981, 1982, 1983, 1984 and 1985) and two cups (1984, 1985) in the restart of the competition, while of the 101 consecutive games without defeat he won 100 and recorded one draw. Of the 100 wins, 86 were consecutive (the longest winning streak in the league until 2016 when Olympiakos broke it), as after their defeat by Glyfada in 1980 the next match without a win was a draw 6–6 against the same team on August 24, 1985.

The 100 wins in the Greek Championship were briefly against the following opponents:

- 11 wins over NO Patras (2 wins in 1981, 1982, 1983, 1984, 1985 and 1 win in 1986)
- 11 wins over NO Chios (2 wins in 1981, 1982, 1983, 1984, 1985, 1 win in 1986)
- 10 wins over NO Vouliagmeni (2 wins in 1981, 1982, 1983, 1984, 1985)
- 10 wins over Olympiakos SFP (2 wins in 1981, 1982, 1983, 1984, 1985)
- 10 wins over Panathinaikos (2 wins in 1981, 1982, 1983, 1984, 1985)
- 10 wins over NO Volos - Argonauts (2 wins in 1981, 1982, 1983, 1984, 1985)
- 9 wins over ANO Glyfada (2 wins in 1981, 1982, 1983, 1984, 1 win in 1985)
- 7 wins over ENO Egyptians (2 wins in 1981, 1984, 1985, 1 win in 1986)
- 6 wins over NAO Corfu (2 wins in 1982, 1984, 1985)
- 5 wins over Aris Thessaloniki (2 wins in 1983, 1985, 1 win in 1986)
- 5 wins over PAOK (2 wins in 1982, 1983, 1 win in 1986)
- 3 wins over AO Palaio Faliro (1 win in 1980, 2 wins in 1981)
- 2 wins over Aris Nicaea (2 wins in 1985)
- 1 victory over Iraklis Thessaloniki (in 1986)

=== 1987–2002 ===
In 1986–87, all the experienced players of the previous decade have left and he competes with the newly acquired Samartzidis, Kaiafas, Patras, while Aronis, as in 1986, will compete in selected games due to obligations with his studies in the USA. 1987–88 saw the last undefeated championship with Ethnikos dominating Glyfada to take first place in regular time and thus home advantage in the finals. In the end, it will only take one match for Ethnikos to reach the limit of five points, with Ethnikos winning the final and with a combination of their victory and draw from regular time against Glyfada taking the title relatively comfortably. The day after winning the championship, he also wins the Cup at the Ilisio swimming pool against Vouliagmeni thanks to a great performance by the evergreen Aronis who, however, leaves at the end of the year, changing team but not city.

In 1988–89, despite finishing first in the regular season (tied with Glyfada), he will lose in the first final to Glyfada at home and thus the title.

In 1989–90 Ethnikos will have problems in the regular season and despite the fact that he finishes second as in 1987, it has already lost three times (to Glyfada, Chios and Olympiakos). In the first stage of the playoffs, he will lose to Iraklis in Piraeus, but he will qualify for the semi-finals where, despite the fact that he had beaten Vouliagmeni twice in regular time, he will not be able to get the draw to qualify for the finals and so he will lose three games in a row (two at home) and for the first time since 1951 he will finish third.

In 1990–91, Ethnikos will return to a title by winning the Cup as an outsider, defeating Glyfada with 10–7 held at OAKA pool, while in the championship he finished fourth (regular season and final four) behind Vouliagmeni, Glyfada and Olympiakos.

In 1991–92 he would finish second behind champions Olympiakos in a season where Ethnikis did not start well but found their footing towards the end of the season and especially in the final four stage where the best four teams participated. He beat twice Vouliagmeni and once Olympiakos in the final stage.

In 1992–93, he would finish third in the regular season and the final phase.

In 1993–94, Ethnikos, coached by Lino Repetto for a short time at the beginning and Kyriakos Iosifidis for most of the season, took first place in the regular season with a record of 17 wins 4 draws and 1 loss making the best regular season since 1988–89. In the playoffs, he faces Iraklis in the quarter-final stage and wins the series 2–0. In the semi-finals against NO Patras he wins 2–0 and then faces Olympiakos with a home advantage for the title. In the first tense match where eight players were sent off, Ethnikos wins 11–10 thanks to a goal in the last second of the match by Manousos Vizyrakis. In the second match, Olympiacos gets the win at the last minute of the game and evens the series (10–9) sending the title to a third and final game. There, Ethnikos leads 6–4 but Olympiacos reacted and sent the final to overtime while having two shots at the post three seconds before the end of the match (8–8 regular time). In extra time, Olympiacos will score with Vlachos and will be close to the title, but 13 seconds before the end of extra time, Samartzidis scores a penalty and thus the final goes to penalties. Voltyrakis of the "red and white" will save two penalties, but Patras of the "blue and white" three with one additional penalty shot by Olympiakos hitting the post.

In 1994–95, Ethnikos finished second in the regular season and reached the finals by eliminating Chania and Glyfada with 2–0 victories, but would lose the championship to Olympiakos in a close series of finals.

In 1995–96 he finished fourth in the regular season and was eliminated by Vouliagmeni in the semi-finals of the league but remained unbeaten against their "eternal" rival and eventual champion Olympiakos, winning 9–8 (10/4/1996) and drawing 10–10 (2/12/1995). This is the only time a champion team has failed to beat a specific opponent during a season. In May 1996 occurred the fatal accident of team's captain and legend Samartzidis, which greatly affected the Piraeus team.

In the 1996–97 and 1997–98 seasons, Ethnikos will face internal administrative and financial problems with the team having their worst years up to that point. Patras, Kaifas, Moustakarias have left and the team now relies on Kalakonas, Kourtidis, while it is also necessary to develop the young Kokkinakis, Schizas, Stellatos, Blanis. In 1998 he finished three points above the relegation zone. Nevertheless, in 1997 he managed to make it very difficult for the later champion Vouliagmeni, losing in the first stage of the playoffs with 2–1 victories, while his one defeat came in overtime.

In 1998–99 and 1999–00 he showed a slight improvement, finishing sixth and fifth respectively. In 2000 the team won the Cup in the final four held in Nikaia despite being the heavy underdogs. Coached by then 30-year-old Giorgos Morfesis, Ethnikos eliminated Vouliagmeni in the semi-final (13–12 in extra time), while in the final they beat the eternal rival Olympiakos 12–11 in extra time who was coached by Yugoslav legend Nikola Stamenic.

In 2000–01 and 2001–02 he finished third in the league. In 2001 he was eliminated by Olympiakos in the semi-finals and in 2002 by Vouliagmeni. In 2002, he beat Panthinaikos for the third place and the exit to the LEN Trophy.

=== 2003–2008 ===
In 2002–03 coached by Dragan Matutinović, Ethnikos men's team competed in the semi-finals of the LEN Trophy, but were knocked out by eventual cup winners Brescia and finished third together with Italian side Savona. In the domestic championship they took the third place. A landmark of the year was the resounding transfer of Vlontakis, one of the best strikers in the world at the time, from the European champion, Olympiakos, as well as Makis Voltyrakis, who had just retired.

In 2003–04 with Voltyrakis now as coach, Ethnikos would finish fifth, disappointing the ambitions that had been created to contest for the championship against Olympiakos and Vouliagmeni.

In 2004–05, Ethnikos having a very good regular season would finish first in the regular season for the first time since '94 (with Vlontakis being declared top scorer) but would lose the title in the fifth final to OSFP, a final with riots occurring at the stands between fans of the two teams and the police. Earlier that year Ethnikos had won the 12th Greek Cup by defeating NO Patras in the final of Thessaloniki. In the semi-final which was more of a final, Ethnikos had to overcome the resistance of Olympiakos with 11–9.

In 2005–06, although Ethnikos drew once and lost once to Olympiakos in the regular season meetings to finish second in the regular season, meaning Ethnikos had home court disadvantage in the finals, they managed to win the 38th championship in the last fifth game decided in overtime by a score of 7–6. Hatzikyriakakis scored the winning goal five seconds before the end, Olympiacos was awarded with a penalty at the last seconds of the extra time and with a goal would send the final to the penalty shootout as in 1994 but Karabetsos saved it. The championship was dedicated to the memory of the late great captain Nondas Samartzidis. This was the 20th time that Ethnikos won the championship and left Olympiakos second.

In 2006–07, the management of Ethnikos, wanting to keep Ethnikos in a leading role, carried out major transfers. They repatriated with a huge price Christos Afroudakis who played in Pozilipo Napoli, brings to Piraeus the goalkeeper of the national team of Serbia, Denis Sefik, while Thodoris Kalakonas, a child who grew up in the club (1990–2001, his first tenure) returned from Panionios. However, Ethnikos could not look strong and will easily lose the Cup final in Kalamata to Olympiakos. In Europe, the blue and whites would be knocked out in the last 16 of the Champions League by Partizan and Brescia, and despite improving in the league playoffs, they would only look competitive in the first two finals, losing the first and winning the second in extra time. Thus Ethnikos lost the championship title 3–1.

In 2007–08, weakened after Sefik and Afroudakis's departure, Ethnikos will not be able to show the resistance he showed in previous years, losing in the semi-final of the Cup to Olympiacos as well as the championship.

=== 2009–present ===
In 2008–09 the team, after administrative turmoil and the departure of funder George Vasilopoulos as well as of several players (Vlontakis, Mazis, Mylonakis, Karabetsos) some of whom had grown up in the club (Kokkinakis, Blanis, Stellatos), had a bad year and was relegated to A2 for first time since 1928. He bounced back immediately but in 2011–12 he will be relegated for the second time without winning a match. The parent club was in major crisis, with the future looking extremely ominous and uncertain. The following season 2012–13, despite the fact that the team was on the verge of extinction and with the main goal of staying in A2, it will be unexpectedly promoted thanks to the management of president Antonis Printezis and the financing of Alexandros Karydopoulos and will play again in A1 in 2013–14 where Ethnikos would be ranked. While Kostas Petrakis was initially the coach for the season, Fanis Kountoudios took over from November 2013, a coach who remains to this day, having completed a decade at the club.

In 2014–15 they had a great regular season and finished second for the first time since 2008, but in the semi-finals of the league playoffs they will be eliminated by PAO and miss out on playing Olympiakos in the finals.

In the very next season, they will again reach the semi-finals of the championship as in 2018–19 when they were eliminated by the champion Olympiakos.

In 2019–20 the team would reach the final of the Greek Cup for the first time since 2007 but would lose the final to the superior OSFP.

In 2020–21 in a year severely affected by the coronavirus pandemic, Ethnikos finished at the bottom of a fourteen team one-round league and luckily there was no team relegation.

In 2021–22 and 2022–23 it finished seventh out of sixteen teams with one of the lowest budgets in the division while also reaching the final four of the cup in 2023.

In total, since 2014, he has won a European ticket four times but did not take advantage of it due to financial weakness, while he has promoted players from an early age in the championship by giving them playing time (Argyropoulos, Chondrokoukis, Mathiopoulos).

=== Records ===
Outline	Record
Most unbeaten championships won	**29**
Most championship won only with wins	**19**
Consecutive championship wins	**18** (1953–1970)
Consecutive unbeaten championship wins	**11** (1953–1963)
Time period staying unbeaten in a domestic championship or domestic cup match	**12 years, 10 months, 16 days** (21 September 1951 – 7 August 1964)
First Greek team to reach the top 4 teams of the European Cup	**1980**
First Greek team to reach the top 8 teams of the European Cup	**1966**
Most matches without conceding a goal in a season	**1980 (4 games out of 18 played)**

=== Seasons ===
==== Panhellenic Championship (1923–1966), National Division (1967–1976), A' National Division (1977–1986) ====
Year	Pos.	Pld	W	D	L
1926	1	4	4	0	0
1927	2				
1928	3				
1929	2				
1930	5				
1931	1	4	4	0	0
1932	4				
1933	2				
1934	2				
1935	–				
1936	5				
1937	2				
1938	3				
1939	–				
1940	5				
1945	3	2	1	0	1
1946	3	5	3	0	**2**
1947	5	2	1	0	1
1948	1	6	5	1	0
1949	2	5	3	1	1

Year	Pos.	Pld	W	D	L	Goals	Diff.
1950	3	5	3	0	**2**	17–15	+2
1951	3	5	2	**2**	1	18–13	+5
1952	2	5	3	**2**	0	18–12	+6
1953	1	5	4	1	0	30–8	+22
1954	1	5	5	0	0	31–8	+23
1955	1	5	5	0	0	27–8	+19
1956	1	6	6	0	0	34–7	+27
1957	1	4	4	0	0	31–5	+26
1958	1	5	5	0	0	39–15	+24
1959	1	6	6	0	0	44–15	+29
1960	1	5	5	0	0	34–11	+23
1961	1	5	5	0	0	42–15	+27
1962	1	10	10	0	0	78–24	+54
1963	1	10	10	0	0	73–25	+48
1964	1	11	10	0	1	67–21	+46
1965	1	10	9	1	0	75–20	+55
1966	1	10	10	0	0	63–19	+44
1967	1	6	4	**2**	0	34–17	+17
1968	1	6	5	0	1	40–19	+21
1969	1	5	4	1	0	29–14	+15

Year	Pos.	Pld	W	D	L	Goals	Diff.
1970	1	9	8	1	0	63–17	+46
1971	2	14	11	1	**2**	118–41	+77
1972	1	15	14	0	1	134–38	+96
1973	1	15	14	0	1	146–38	+108
1974	1	14	14	0	0		
1975	1	14	13	1	0		
1976	1	12	12	0	0	144–37	+107
1977	1	15	14	0	1		
1978	1	15	14	0	1		
1979	1	14	13	1	0	129–31	+98
1980	1	18	17	0	1	203–34	+169
1981	1	18	18	0	0		
1982	1	18	18	0	0		
1983	1	18	18	0	0	229–99	+130
1984	1	18	18	0	0	231–112	+119
1985	1	**22**	**21**	1	0	312–151	+161
1986	2	**22**	19	**2**	1	282–141	+141

==== Α1 National Division (1987–) ====
Year	Pos.	Pld	W	D	L	Goals	Diff.	Coach
1986–87	2	20	13	**4**	3	146–107	+39	(Hungary) Péter Rusorán
1987–88	1	18	17	1	0	205–91	+114	(Hungary) Péter Rusorán
1988–89	2	20	16	1	3	214–126	+88	(Hungary) Péter Rusorán
1989–90	3	19	11	1	7	158–144	+14	(Greece) Markellos Sitarenios
1990–91	4	24	13	1	10	307–241	+66	(Greece) Giannis Karalogos
1991–92	2	24	17	2	5	287–227	+60	(Greece) Koulis Iosifidis
1992–93	3	28	17	**4**	7	323–264	+59	(Greece) Koulis Iosifidis
1993–94	1	29	23	**4**	2	334–207	+127	(Greece) Koulis Iosifidis
1994–95	2	29	20	2	7	305–213	+92	(Greece) Giannis Giannouris
1995–96	4	27	17	2	8	270–226	+44	(Croatia) Miro Trumbic
1996–97	8	25	10	1	14	224–230	–6	(Croatia) Miro Trumbic
1997–98	9	22	6	2	14	231–247	–16	(Greece) Andreas Garyfallos
1998–99	6	25	12	2	11	253–233	+20	(Greece) Giannis Karalogos
1999–00	5	24	16	0	8	252–212	+40	(Hungary) Péter Rusorán, (Greece) Giorgos Morfesis
2000–01	3	**30**	18	**4**	8	329–263	+66	(Greece) Michalis Xanthopoulos
2001–02	3	29	19	3	7	266–239	+27	(Greece) Ilias Machairas
2002–03	3	29	20	3	6	341–221	+120	(Croatia) Dragan Matutinović
2003–04	5	27	18	2	7	291–221	+70	(Greece) Makis Voltirakis
2004–05	2	29	**24**	1	4	335–220	+115	(Greece) Makis Voltirakis
2005–06	1	29	**24**	2	3	375–201	+174	(Greece) Makis Voltirakis
2006–07	2	28	21	1	6	382–181	+201	(Greece) Makis Voltirakis
2007–08	2	28	23	0	5	304–198	+106	(Greece) Makis Voltirakis
2008–09	11	22	4	1	17	179–226	–47	(Greece) Dimitris Kritikos
2010–11	8	22	7	2	13	176–225	–49	(Greece) Dimitris Mavrotas
2011–12	12	22	0	1	**21**	121–273	–152	(Greece) Dimitris Mavrotas
2013–14	6	22	9	2	11	189–224	–35	(Greece) Kostas Petrakis, (Greece) Fanis Kountoudios
2014–15	4	26	18	0	8	246–207	+39	(Greece) Fanis Kountoudios
2015–16	4	28	14	3	11	244–230	+14	(Greece) Fanis Kountoudios
2016–17	8	22	9	2	11	152–174	–22	(Greece) Fanis Kountoudios
2017–18	5	25	13	1	11	195–211	–16	(Greece) Fanis Kountoudios
2018–19	4	29	13	**4**	12	232–247	–15	(Greece) Fanis Kountoudios
2019–20	6	22	10	2	10	173–205	–32	(Greece) Fanis Kountoudios
2020–21	14	13	1	0	12	88–148	–60	(Greece) Fanis Kountoudios
2021–22	7	26	15	1	12	275–287	–12	(Greece) Fanis Kountoudios
2022–23	7	29	9	0	20	256–343	–87	(Greece) Fanis Kountoudios
2023–24	10	25	9	4	12	222–243	–21	(Greece) Fanis Kountoudios

==== Statistics (post-war) ====
- Largest victory margin: **+23 (Ethnikos – Vouliagmeni 23–0, 1981,** **Aris Nikaias – Ethnikos 6–29, 1985, Nireas Chalandriou – Ethnikos 2–25, 2006–07)**
- Largest loss margin: **–19 (Olympiakos – Ethnikos 21–2, 2016–17)**
- Most goals scored in a match: **29 (Aris Nikaias – Ethnikos 6–29, 1985)**
- Fewer goals in an A1 National Division match (since 1987): **1 (Ethnikos – Olympiakos 1–9, 2002–03, Vouliagmeni – Ethnikos 5–1, 2015–16, Vouliagmeni – Ethnikos 7–1, 2018–19, Panionios – Ethnikos 8–1, 2020–21)**
- Most goals conceded in an A1 National Division match (since 1987): **24 (Olympiakos – Ethnikos 24–6, 2019–20)**
- Fewer goals scored by an opponent in an A1 National Division match (since 1987): **1 (Iraklis – Ethnikos 1–16, 1994–95,** **Ethnikos – Palaio Faliro 16–1, 2006–07, Glyfada – Ethnikos 1–7, 2006–07, Ethnikos – Kalamaki 11–1, 2016–17)**

==== Top scorer in the Α1 National Division championship (1987–) ====
Season	Player	Goals
1986–87	(Greece) Nondas Samartzidis	33
1987–88	(Greece) Nondas Samartzidis (2)	56
1988–89	(Greece) Nondas Samartzidis (3)	59
1989–90	(Greece) Nondas Samartzidis (4), (Greece) Tasos Tsikaris	32
1990–91	(Greece) Nondas Samartzidis (5)	98
1991–92	(Greece) Nondas Samartzidis (6)	90
1992–93	(Greece) Ilias Machairas	48
1993–94	(Greece) Nondas Samartzidis (7)	57
1994–95	(Greece) Nondas Samartzidis (8)	54
1997–98	(Greece) Theodoros Kalakonas	52
1998–99	(Greece) Konstantinos Kokkinakis	52
1999–00	(Greece) Konstantinos Kokkinakis (2)	
2001–02	(United States) Wolf Wigo	43
2002–03	(Greece) Antonios Vlontakis	73
2003–04	(Greece) Antonios Vlontakis (2)	66
2004–05	(Greece) Antonios Vlontakis (3)	85
2005–06	(Greece) Antonios Vlontakis (4)	62
2006–07	(Greece) Christos Afroudakis	54
2007–08	(Greece) Theodoros Kalakonas (2)	48
2008–09	(Greece) Marios Chatzikyriakakis, (Croatia) Tomislav Primorac	41
2010–11	(Greece) Giannis Katrouzanakis	32
2011–12	(Greece) Maximos Petrochelios, (Greece) Giorgos Alevizos	17
2013–14	(Greece) Christos Koutsialis	44
2014–15	(Greece) Dionysis Karountzos	61
2015–16	(Greece) Stelios Argyropoulos	54
2016–17	(Greece) Panagiotis Papadoggonas	38
2017–18	(Greece) Dionysis Karountzos (2)	51
2018–19	(Greece) Aggelos Foskolos	48
2019–20	(Greece) Konstantinos Chondrokoukis	27
2020–21	(Greece) Konstantinos Chondrokoukis (2)	30
2021–22	(Greece) Dimos Dermitzakis	43
2022–23	(Greece) Konstantinos Mathiopoulos	36

==== Α2 National Division (1987–) ====
Year	Pos.	Pld	W	D	L	Goals	Diff.	Coach
2009–10	1	**22**	**21**	1	0	250–103	+147	(Greece) Dimitris Mavrotas
2012–13	2	16	12	**2**	**2**	161–118	+43	(Greece) Kostas Petrakis

==== Statistics ====
- Largest victory margin: **+13** **(Ethnikos – OFI 16–3, 2009–10)**
- Largest loss margin: **–6 (Nireas Lamias – Ethnikos 14–8, 2012–13)**
- Most goals scored in a match: **17 (Ethnikos – Peristeri 17–6, 2009–10)**
- Fewer goals scored in a match: **6** **(Ethnikos – Triton Maroussi 6–2, 2009–10)**
- Most goals scored by an opponent in a match: **14** (**Nireas Lamias – Ethnikos 14–8, 2012–13)**
- Fewer goals scored by an opponent in a match: **2** **(Ethnikos – Volos 13–2, 2009–10, Ethnikos – Syros 11–2, 2009–10, Kerkyra – Ethnikos 2–12, 2009–10, Ethnikos – Triton Maroussi 6–2, 2009–10, Ilissiakos – Ethnikos 2–8, 2009–10, Ethnikos – Nireas Geraka 12–2, 2012–13)**

=== European Competitions ===
Year	Opponent	Score	Competition	Year	Opponent	Score	Competition
1964	(Italy) Canottieri Napoli	0–6	European Cup	1984	(West Germany) Spandau 04	6–12	European Cup
1964	(Austria) Wiener SC	2–8	European Cup	1984	(Spain) CN Montjuïc	12–12	European Cup
1964	(Spain) CN Barcelona	1–5	European Cup	1984	(France) CN Marseille	10–7	European Cup
1965	(France) CN Marseille	5–4	European Cup	1985	(Romania) CS Crișul Oradea	6–8	European Cup
1965	(Spain) CN Barcelona	4–6	European Cup	1985	(Spain) CN Montjuïc	8–10	European Cup
1965	(Socialist Federal Republic of Yugoslavia) VK Partizan	1–11	European Cup	1985	(Italy) CN Posillipo Napoli	9–11	European Cup
09/10/1966	(Austria) Vienna	7–5	European Cup	1988–89	(Netherlands) Alphen	8–12	European Cup
10/10/1966	(Spain) CN Barcelona	2–0	European Cup	1988–89	(Italy) CN Posillipo Napoli	8–16	European Cup
11/10/1966	(Socialist Federal Republic of Yugoslavia) VK Partizan	2–7	European Cup	1988–89	(Belgium) Gent	16–9	European Cup
20/11/1966	(West Germany) Rote Erde Hamm	1–2	European Cup Last 8	1991–92	(Turkey) Yusme	17–4	Cup Winner's Cup
19/11/1966	(Socialist Federal Republic of Yugoslavia) VK Partizan	3–15	European Cup Last 8	1991–92	(Slovakia) Slavia Bratislava	10–9	Cup Winner's Cup
18/11/1966	(Romania) Dinamo Bucharest	1–10	European Cup Last 8	1991–92	(Italy) Volturno Napoli	7–14	Cup Winner's Cup
1967	(France) CN Marseille	6–3	European Cup	1991–92	(Socialist Federal Republic of Yugoslavia) VK Partizan	7–9	Cup Winner's Cup Quarterfinals
1967	(Austria) Vienna	3–2	European Cup	1991–92	(Socialist Federal Republic of Yugoslavia) VK Partizan	9–9	Cup Winner's Cup Quarterfinals
1967	(Socialist Federal Republic of Yugoslavia) VK Mladost	2–5	European Cup	1992–93	(Turkey) Turkeyt	21–1	LEN Trophy
1967	(Spain) CN Barcelona	1–4	European Cup	1992–93	(Romania) CS Crișul Oradea	9–6	LEN Trophy
1968	(Austria) Vienna	7–3	European Cup	1992–93	(Slovakia) Košice	7–8	LEN Trophy
1968	(Spain) CN Barcelona	3–17	European Cup	1992–93	(Italy) Pro Recco	6–9	LEN Trophy
1968	(Socialist Federal Republic of Yugoslavia) VK Partizan	3–9	European Cup	1994–95	(Israel) Maccabi Tel–Aviv	8–4	European Cup
1968	(France) CN Marseille	6–7	European Cup	1994–95	(Slovenia) Koper	12–5	European Cup
1970	(Austria) Graz	8–6	European Cup	1994–95	(Spain) CN Catalunya	3–11	European Cup
1970	(Slovakia) Košice	7–1	European Cup	1994–95	(Hungary) Újpesti TE	8–12	European Cup Quarterfinals
1970	(Poland) Arkonia	5–6	European Cup	1994–95	(Hungary) Újpesti TE	5–13	European Cup Quarterfinals
1970	(Spain) CN Barcelona	4–4	European Cup	1995–96	(France) CN Marseille	4–5	LEN Trophy
1970	(Bulgaria) Akademik Sofia	3–5	European Cup Last 8	1995–96	(Croatia) Dalmatia Split	5–6	LEN Trophy
1970	(Sweden) SKK Stockholm	3–3	European Cup Last 8	1995–96	(Russia) CSKA Moscow	5–7	LEN Trophy
1970	(Socialist Federal Republic of Yugoslavia) VK Partizan	4–11	European Cup Last 8	1996–97	(Croatia) VK Jadran Split	7–8	LEN Trophy
1972	(Finland) Helsingfors	10–3	European Cup	1996–97	(Spain) CN Catalunya	6–9	LEN Trophy
1972	(France) Valenciennes	10–3	European Cup	1996–97	(Denmark) Kastrup	16–7	LEN Trophy
1972	(Sweden) SKK Stockholm	9–4	European Cup	2000–01	(Austria) Salzburg	18–1	Cup Winner's Cup
1972	(Turkey) Istanbul	8–4	European Cup	2000–01	(Serbia and Montenegro) Jadran Herceg Novi	8–9	Cup Winner's Cup
1972	(Socialist Federal Republic of Yugoslavia) VK Partizan	5–11	European Cup	2000–01	(North Macedonia) Mladost Skopje	12–4	Cup Winner's Cup
1972	(Hungary) Orvosegyetem SC	5–9	European Cup	2000–01	(Spain) CN Barceloneta	6–9	Cup Winner's Cup Quarterfinals
1972	(Spain) CN Barcelona	3–5	European Cup Last 8	2000–01	(Spain) CN Barceloneta	9–9	Cup Winner's Cup Quarterfinals
1972	(Soviet Union) CSKA Moscow	2–4	European Cup Last 8	2001–02	(West Germany) Rote Erde Hamm	4–5	LEN Trophy Last 16
1972	(Hungary) Orvosegyetem SC	3–9	European Cup Last 8	2001–02	(Hungary) Ferencvaros TC	7–6	LEN Trophy Last 16
1973	(Austria) Graz	6–4	European Cup	2001–02	(Croatia) VK Primorje Rijeka	5–7	LEN Trophy Last 16
1973	(Turkey) Galatasaray	9–0	European Cup	2002–03	(Portugal) Portuense	25–1	LEN Trophy First Phase
1973	(Slovakia) Košice	3–2	European Cup	2002–03	(France) Strasbourg	6–5	LEN Trophy First Phase
1973	(Denmark) Χέρμεν	12–3	European Cup	2002–03	(Russia) Spartak Volgograd	11–3	LEN Trophy Second Phase
1973	(Netherlands) De Meeuwen	4–5	European Cup	2002–03	(Spain) CN Catalunya	6–2	LEN Trophy Second Phase
1973	(Sweden) SKK Stockholm	3–6	European Cup	2002–03	(Hungary) BVSC	8–3	LEN Trophy Second Phase
1973	(Soviet Union) MGU Moscow	0–11	European Cup	2002–03	(Italy) AN Brescia	5–8	LEN Trophy Second Phase
1973	(Netherlands) De Meeuwen	6–10	European Cup Second Phase	2002–03	(Serbia and Montenegro) VK Primorac Kotor	7–8	LEN Trophy Quarterfinals
1973	(Bulgaria) CSKA Sofia	7–8	European Cup Second Phase	2002–03	(Serbia and Montenegro) VK Primorac Kotor	5–3	LEN Trophy Quarterfinals
1973	(Socialist Federal Republic of Yugoslavia) VK Partizan	4–12	European Cup Second Phase	2002–03	(Italy) AN Brescia	5–8	LEN Trophy Semifinals
1974	(Bulgaria) CSKA Sofia	2–1	European Cup	2002–03	(Italy) AN Brescia	4–9	LEN Trophy Semifinals
1974	(West Germany) Würzburg	2–2	European Cup	2003–04	(West Germany) Duisburg	10–4	Euroleague Qualification
1974	(Spain) CN Barcelona	6–6	European Cup	2003–04	(Croatia) VK Primorje Rijeka	5–11	Euroleague Qualification
1974	(Soviet Union) MGU Moscow	2–9	European Cup	2003–04	(Serbia and Montenegro) VK Primorac Kotor	10–15	Euroleague Qualification
1975	(Austria) Graz	6–5	European Cup	2003–04	(Ukraine) Mariupol	7–6	Euroleague Qualification
1975	(West Germany) Rote Erde Hamm	3–5	European Cup	2003–04	(Netherlands) Alphen	7–6	Euroleague Qualification
1975	(Spain) CN Barcelona	2–6	European Cup	2003–04	(Spain) CN Martiánez	7–5	LEN Trophy
1975	(Socialist Federal Republic of Yugoslavia) VK Partizan	5–7	European Cup	2003–04	(Russia) Dynamo Moscow	11–15	LEN Trophy
1976	(Sweden) SKK Stockholm	4–2	European Cup	2003–04	(Serbia and Montenegro) Niš	6–9	LEN Trophy Last 16
1976	(Romania) Rapid Bucharest	7–9	European Cup	2003–04	(Serbia and Montenegro) Niš	7–7	LEN Trophy Last 16
1976	(Soviet Union) CSKA Moscow	7–9	European Cup	2004–05	(England) Cheltenham	14–3	LEN Trophy
1976	(Netherlands) Den Haag	7–8	European Cup	2004–05	(Croatia) Medveščak Zagreb	7–8	LEN Trophy
1977	(Sweden) Västerås	9–4	European Cup	2004–05	(Russia) Kazan	9–10	LEN Trophy
1977	(France) CN Marseille	11–0	European Cup	2004–05	(Belgium) Eeklo	18–4	LEN Trophy
1977	(Switzerland) Horgen	7–1	European Cup	2004–05	(France) Strasbourg	9–6	LEN Trophy
1977	(Soviet Union) CSKA Moscow	5–7	European Cup	2004–05	(Hungary) Újpesti TE	7–8	LEN Trophy Second Phase
1977	(West Germany) Würzburg	3–2	European Cup Last 8	2004–05	(Slovenia) Koper	7–6	LEN Trophy Second Phase
1977	(Switzerland) Horgen	7–4	European Cup Last 8	2004–05	(Serbia and Montenegro) VK Primorac Kotor	6–7	LEN Trophy Second Phase
1977	(Socialist Federal Republic of Yugoslavia) VK Partizan	4–6	European Cup Last 8	2005–06	(Switzerland) Schaffhausen	13–5	Euroleague Qualification
1978	(West Germany) Würzburg	3–5	European Cup	2005–06	(Serbia and Montenegro) VK Primorac Kotor	9–8	Euroleague Qualification
1978	(France) CN Marseille	4–2	European Cup	2005–06	(West Germany) Duisburg	12–11	Euroleague Qualification
1978	(Denmark) Odense	7–6	European Cup	2005–06	(Ukraine) Mariupol	12–5	Euroleague Qualification
1978	(Austria) Graz	10–1	European Cup	2005–06	(Turkey) Heybeliada	19–3	Euroleague Qualification II
1978	(Slovakia) Košice	7–5	European Cup Last 8	2005–06	(West Germany) Cannstatt	13–15	Euroleague Qualification II
1978	(Spain) CN Montjuïc	7–7	European Cup Last 8	2005–06	(Italy) CN Posillipo Napoli	11–8	Euroleague Qualification II
1978	(Italy) Pro Recco	3–5	European Cup Last 8	2005–06	(Italy) Savona	6–9	Euroleague Last 16
1979	(Slovakia) Košice	3–4	European Cup	2005–06	(Spain) CN Barcelona	14–12	Euroleague Last 16
1979	(France) CN Marseille	4–3	European Cup	2005–06	(Serbia and Montenegro) VK Partizan	6–7	Euroleague Last 16
1979	(Italy) Canottieri Napoli	6–4	European Cup	2005–06	(Serbia and Montenegro) VK Partizan	3–7	Euroleague Last 16
1979	(Slovakia) Košice	4–8	European Cup Last 8	2005–06	(Spain) CN Barcelona	13–14	Euroleague Last 16
1979	(Hungary) Vasas SC	4–7	European Cup Last 8	2005–06	(Italy) Savona	11–7	Euroleague Last 16
1979	(Spain) CN Montjuïc	5–7	European Cup Last 8	2006–07	(Croatia) VK Mladost	7–9	Euroleague Last 16
25/10/1980	(Soviet Union) MGU Moscow	5–4	European Cup	2006–07	(Italy) AN Brescia	7–7	Euroleague Last 16
26/10/1980	(Hungary) Vasas SC	4–4'	European Cup	2006–07	(Serbia) VK Partizan	11–11	Euroleague Last 16
14/11/1980	(Sweden) SKK Stockholm	12–4	European Cup Last 8	2006–07	(Serbia) VK Partizan	7–9	Euroleague Last 16
15/11/1980	(Netherlands) De Robben	6–4	European Cup Last 8	2006–07	(Italy) AN Brescia	9–10	Euroleague Last 16
16/11/1980	(West Germany) Spandau 04	4–5	European Cup Last 8	2006–07	(Croatia) VK Mladost	12–11	Euroleague Last 16
05/12/1980	(Hungary) Vasas SC	4–4	European Cup Final Four	2007–08	(Spain) Terrassa	7–6	Euroleague Qualification II
06/12/1980	(Socialist Federal Republic of Yugoslavia) VK Jug Dubrovnik	6–9	European Cup Final Four	2007–08	(Slovenia) Olimpija Ljubljana	12–4	Euroleague Qualification II
07/12/1980	(West Germany) Spandau 04	5–7	European Cup Final Four	2007–08	(Serbia) Vojvodina	13–4	Euroleague Qualification II
1981	(Switzerland) Horgen	16–5	European Cup	2007–08	(West Germany) Spandau 04	9–7	Euroleague Qualification II
1981	(Denmark) Odense	20–5	European Cup	2007–08	(Montenegro) VK Primorac Kotor	8–10	Euroleague Qualification II
1981	(Spain) CN Barcelona	10–11	European Cup	2007–08	(Croatia) VK Jug Dubrovnik	8–9	Euroleague Last 16
1981	(Hungary) Vasas SC	8–11	European Cup Last 8	2007–08	(Hungary) Honved	4–9	Euroleague Last 16
1981	(Socialist Federal Republic of Yugoslavia) VK Jug Dubrovnik	6–11	European Cup Last 8	2007–08	(Hungary) Vasas SC	8–10	Euroleague Last 16
1981	(Netherlands) Alphen	8–10	European Cup Last 8	2007–08	(Hungary) Vasas SC	8–13	Euroleague Last 16
1982	(Switzerland) Horgen	8–4	European Cup	2007–08	(Hungary) Honved	8–12	Euroleague Last 16
1982	(Sweden) SKK Stockholm	9–5	European Cup	2007–08	(Croatia) VK Jug Dubrovnik	8–12	Euroleague Last 16
1982	(Netherlands) De Robben	8–9	European Cup	2008–09	(Hungary) Honved	7–24	Euroleague Qualification II
1982	(Socialist Federal Republic of Yugoslavia) VK Jug Dubrovnik	9–11	European Cup	2008–09	(Ukraine) Mariupol	9–7	Euroleague Qualification II
1983	(West Germany) Spandau 04	5–10	European Cup	2008–09	(Russia) Spartak Volgograd	2–15	Euroleague Qualification II
1983	(Wales) Cardiff	13–9	European Cup	2008–09	(Netherlands) Eindhoven	7–7	Euroleague Qualification II
1983	(Austria) Vienna	22–6	European Cup	2008–09	(Montenegro) Jadran Herceg Novi	4–14	Euroleague Qualification II
1983	(Netherlands) Alphen	7–13	European Cup Last 8				
1983	(Spain) CN Barcelona	9–9	European Cup Last 8				
1983	(Socialist Federal Republic of Yugoslavia) VK Jug Dubrovnik	6–10	European Cup Last 8				

=== Honours ===
- **Greek Water Polo Championship**
  - Winners (38): **1926**, **1931**, **1948**, **1953**, **1954**, **1955**, **1956**, **1957**, **1958**, **1959**, **1960**, **1961**, **1962**, **1963**, 1964, **1965**, **1966**, **1967**, 1968, **1969**, **1970**, 1972, 1973, **1974**, **1975**, **1976**, 1977, 1978, **1979**, 1980, **1981**, **1982**, **1983**, **1984**, **1985**, **1988**, 1994, 2006
    - In bold, the years when Ethnikos won the title unbeaten, in bold and underlined, when the team won the title exclusively with wins.
- **Greek Water Polo Cup**
  - Winners (12): 1953, 1954, 1955, 1956, 1957, 1958, 1984, 1985, 1988, 1991, 2000, 2005
- **Central Greece Water Polo Championship**
  - **Winners (11)**: 1952, 1953, 1954, 1955, 1956, 1957, 1959, 1960, 1961, 1962, 1963
- **LEN Champions League**
  - Fourth place: 1980
  - Quarterfinals: 1966, 1970, 1972, 1977, 1978, 1979, 1981, 1983, 1995
- **Doubles (all of them unbeaten)**
  - (9): 1953, 1954, 1955, 1956, 1957, 1958, 1984, 1985, 1988

=== Tom Hoad Cup ===
Ethnikos Piraeus took part in the Tom Hoad Cup at the Melville Water Polo Club, Fremantle, Australia. There were six teams competing from around the world: the Fremantle Mariners (Australia), Ethnikos Piraeus (Greece), Galatasaray Water Polo Team (Turkey), Japan National Water Polo Team, The Barbarians and a composite European team including three Hungarian Olympic gold medalists. The competition took place from the 27th-30 December 2008, with gold going to The Barbarians.

=== Captains ===
Tenure	Captain
1950–1968	(Greece) Andreas Garyfallos
1969–1970	(Greece) Giannis Thymaras
1971–1979	(Greece) Kyriakos Iosifidis
1980–1986	(Greece) Thomas Karalogos
1987–1989	(Greece) Antonios Aronis
1990	(Greece) Nikos Armenakis
1991–1994	(Greece) Thodoris Moustakarias
1995–1996	(Greece) Nondas Samartzidis
1997–2001	(Greece) Theodoros Kalakonas
2002–2008	(Greece) Konstantinos Kokkinakis
2009	(Greece) Marios Chatzikyriakakis
2010–2012	(Greece) Charis Kechagias
2013–2014	(Greece) Giannis Chatzialexis
2015–2016	(Greece) Marios Chatzikyriakakis
2017–2020	(Greece) Panagiotis Papadoggonas
2021–2022	(Greece) Nikitas Kocheilas
2023	(Greece) Panagiotis Papadoggonas
2024–	(Montenegro) Djordje Tesanovic

=== Notable players ===
- (Greece) Christos Afroudakis
- (Greece) Antonios Aronis
- (Greece) Marios Chatzikyriakakis
- (Greece) Panagiotis Chatzikyriakakis
- (Greece) Petros Chatzikyriakakis
- (Greece) Andreas Garifallos
- (Greece) Ioannis Garifallos
- (United States) Chris Humbert
- (Greece) Kyriakos Iosifidis
- (Greece) Filippos Kaiafas
- (Greece) Konstantinos Kokkinakis
- (Greece) Theodoros Kalakonas
- (Greece) Giannis Karalogos
- (Greece) Thomas Karalogos
- (Greece) Nikitas Kocheilas
- (Greece) Dimitrios Konstas
- (Greece) Dimitrios Kougevetopoulos
- (Greece) Theodoros Lorantos
- (Greece) Dimitrios Mazis
- (Greece) Thodoris Moustakarias
- (Greece) Emmanouil Mylonakis
- (Greece) Evangelos Patras
- (Greece) Nondas Samartzidis
- (Greece) Tasos Schizas
- (Greece) Markellos Sitarenios
- (Greece) Evangelos Patras
- (Greece) Nondas Samartzidis
- (United States) Jesse Smith
- (Greece) Sotiris Stathakis
- (Greece) Giannis Thymaras
- (Greece) Antonios Vlontakis
- (Greece) Makis Voltirakis
- (United States) Wolf Wigo

=== Notable coaches ===
- (Greece) Andreas Garifallos
- (Greece) Kyriakos Iosifidis
- (Greece) Giannis Karalogos
- (Greece) Giorgos Morfesis
- (Greece) Gerasimos Voltirakis
- (Hungary) Péter Rusorán
- (Hungary) László Sárosi
- (Italy) Alfio Flores
- (Italy) Lino Repetto

== Women's team ==
The women's team of Ethnikos has won 3 championships and 2 European cups (LEN Trophy). The current season (2025–26) is competing in the first division championship (A1 Ethniki). The team has competed in every season of the Greek League since it was established in 1989.

Season	Division	Place
1987–88	A1 Ethniki	1st
1988–89	A1 Ethniki	3rd
1989–90	A1 Ethniki	1st
1990–91	A1 Ethniki	2nd
1991–92	A1 Ethniki	1st
1992–93	A1 Ethniki	3rd
1993–94	A1 Ethniki	6th
1994–95	A1 Ethniki	5th
1995–96	A1 Ethniki	5th
1996–97	A1 Ethniki	4th
1997–98	A1 Ethniki	4th
1998–99	A1 Ethniki	7th
1999-00	A1 Ethniki	7th
2000–01	A1 Ethniki	7th

Season	Division	Place	Europe
2001–02	A1 Ethniki	5th	
2002–03	A1 Ethniki	7th	
2003–04	A1 Ethniki	4th	
2004–05	A1 Ethniki	2nd	
2005–06	A1 Ethniki	5th	LEN Champions League First round
2006–07	A1 Ethniki	5th	
2007–08	A1 Ethniki	4th	
2008–09	A1 Ethniki	3rd	LEN Trophy Quarterfinalists
2009–10	A1 Ethniki	3rd	LEN Trophy Winners, LEN Supercup Finalists
2010–11	A1 Ethniki	3rd	
2011–12	A1 Ethniki	6th	
2012–13	A1 Ethniki	5th	
2013–14	A1 Ethniki	6th	
2014–15	A1 Ethniki	4th	

Season	Division	Place	Europe
2015–16	A1 Ethniki	4th	
2016–17	A1 Ethniki	4th	
2017–18	A1 Ethniki	3rd	
2018–19	A1 Ethniki	3rd	LEN Champions League Preliminary Round
2019–20	A1 Ethniki	5th	
2020–21	A1 Ethniki	4th	
2021–22	A1 Ethniki	4th	LEN Champions League Quarterfinalists; LEN Trophy Winners, LEN Supercup Finalists
2022–23	A1 Ethniki	3rd	LEN Champions League; Top 16; LEN Euro Cup Quarterfinalists
2023–24	A1 Ethniki	4th	LEN Champions League Top 16
2024–25	A1 Ethniki	5th	LEN Euro Cup Quarterfinalists
2025–26	A1 Ethniki	TBD	LEN Euro Cup Quarterfinalists

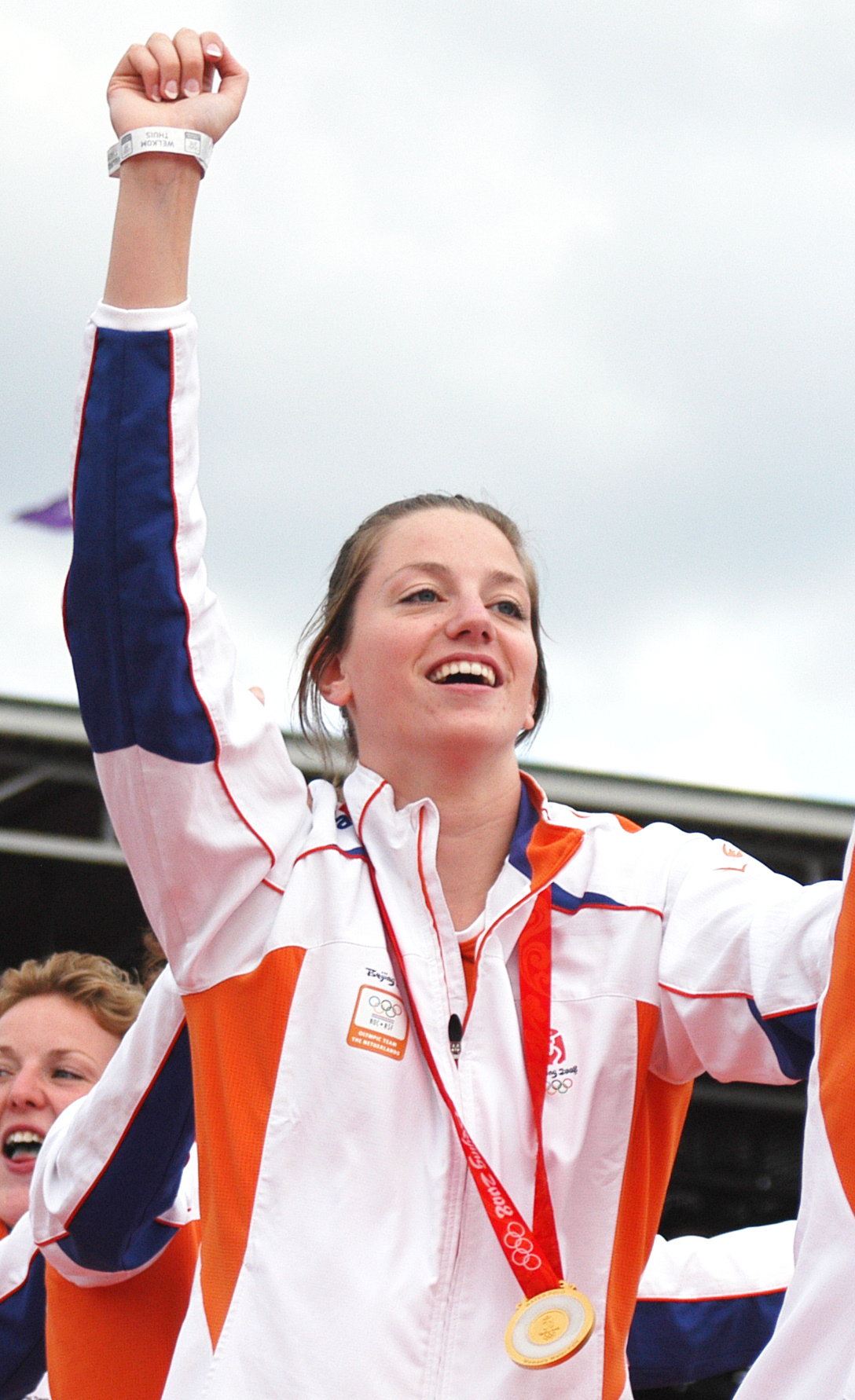
2008 Olympic gold medalist. Iefke van Belkum

=== The road to two LEN Trophy victories ===
Date	City	Opponent	Score	Tournament Phase
2009–10 Women's LEN Trophy
18/12/2009	Zagreb, Croatia	(Spain) CN Mataró	12–6	LEN Trophy Last 16
19/12/2009	Zagreb, Croatia	(France) Union St-Bruno Bordeaux	14–2	LEN Trophy Last 16
20/12/2009	Zagreb, Croatia	(Croatia) HAVK Mladost	12–3	LEN Trophy Last 16
23/01/2010	Piraeus, Greece	(Italy) CC Ortigia	9–7	LEN Trophy Quarterfinal 1st Leg
06/02/2010	Syracuse, Italy	(Italy) CC Ortigia	7–4	LEN Trophy Quarterfinal 2nd Leg
21/02/2010	Gouda, Netherlands	(Netherlands) GZC Donk	10–8	LEN Trophy Semifinal 1st Leg
06/03/2010	Piraeus, Greece	(Netherlands) GZC Donk	8–6	LEN Trophy Semifinal 2nd Leg
17/03/2010	Khanty-Mansiysk, Russia	(Russia) Jugra Chanty-Mansiysk	12–13	LEN Trophy Final 1st Leg
07/04/2010	Piraeus, Greece	(Russia) Jugra Chanty-Mansiysk	10–9 3–3 (ext) 4–1 (pen)	LEN Trophy Final 2nd Leg
2021–22 Women's LEN Euroleague
18/11/2021	Porto, Portugal	(Italy) AS Orizzonte Catania	14–15	LEN Euroleague Preliminary Round
19/11/2021	Porto, Portugal	(Portugal) Pacense	25–4	LEN Euroleague Preliminary Round
19/11/2021	Porto, Portugal	(Spain) CN Sabadell	8–15	LEN Euroleague Preliminary Round
21/11/2021	Porto, Portugal	(Slovakia) Olympia Kosice	23–4	LEN Euroleague Preliminary Round
10/12/2021	Piraeus, Greece	(Italy) SIS Roma	14–5	LEN Euroleague Last 16
11/12/2021	Piraeus, Greece	(Spain) CN Terrassa	8–7	LEN Euroleague Last 16
12/12/2021	Piraeus, Greece	(Greece) Olympiacos	5–9	LEN Euroleague Last 16
05/02/2022	Piraeus, Greece	(Spain) CN Sabadell	8–13	LEN Euroleague Quarterfinal 1st Leg
26/02/2022	Sabadell, Spain	(Spain) CN Sabadell	6–8	LEN Euroleague Quarterfinal 2nd Leg
2021–22 Women's LEN Trophy
25/03/2022	Budapest, Hungary	(Hungary) Dunaújvárosi FVE	12–8	LEN Trophy Final 1st Leg
30/03/2022	Piraeus, Greece	(Hungary) Dunaújvárosi FVE	14–9	LEN Trophy Final 2nd Leg

=== Honours ===
- Women's LEN Trophy
  - Winners (2): 2010, 2022
- Greek Championships
  - Winners (3): 1988, 1990, 1992
- Greek Cup
  - Winners (1): 2024
- LEN Supercup
  - Finalist (2): 2010, 2022

=== Notable players ===
- (Greece) Stella Aroni
- (Greece) Elena Elliniadi
- (Greece) Sofia Iosifidou
- (Greece) Aikaterini Oikonomopoulou
- (Greece) Markella Ploumi
- (Greece) Maria Tsouri
- (Greece) (United States) Ioanna Haralabidis
- (Greece) (United States) Stephania Haralabidis
- (Brazil) Marina Canetti
- (Netherlands) Iefke van Belkum
- (United States) Ashleigh Johnson
- (Russia) Maria Borisova

=== Notable coaches ===
- (Netherlands) Koen Plasmeijer
