= Ioannis Karalogos =

Greek water polo player

Personal information
- Nationality: Greek
- Born: 27 September 1949 (age 75)

Sport
- Sport: Water polo

Ioannis Karalogos (born 27 September 1949) is a Greek former water polo player and coach. He competed in the men's tournament at the 1972 Summer Olympics. He played at club level for Greek powerhouse club Ethnikos Piraeus and he was also a coach for Ethnikos in the 80s.
