= Gerasimos Voltirakis =

Greek water polo player

Makis Voltirakis
Personal information
- Nationality: Greece
- Born: 14 May 1968 (age 58) Athens, Greece

Sport
- Sport: Water polo
- Position: Goalkeeper

Senior clubs
- Years: Team
- -1988: NO Chania
- 1988-1992: Ethnikos Piraeus
- 1992-2002: Olympiacos
Medal record
Men's Water polo
Representing Greece
FINA World Cup
Silver medal – second place	1997 Athens	Team

Gerasimos "Makis" Voltirakis (born 14 May 1968) is a Greek retired water polo player and current water polo coach. Voltirakis was a member of Greece men's national water polo team from 1991 to 1997, with whom he competed in the 1992 Summer Olympics and in the 1996 Summer Olympics. He was part of the Greece men's national water polo team that won the silver medal at the 1997 World Cup in Athens, being voted the tournament's best goalkeeper.

Voltirakis played for Greek powerhouses Ethnikos and Olympiacos, with whom he won the 2001–02 LEN Champions League in Budapest, being the captain of the team. He was also runner-up of the 2000–01 LEN Champions League in Dubrovnik with Olympiacos.

Voltirakis was captain of the Olympiacos squad that won the 2002 Triple Crown (LEN Champions League, Greek Championship, Greek Cup). He also won 7 Greek Championships, 5 Greek Cups and 2 Greek Super Cups with Olympiacos.

== Honours ==
=== Club ===
Olympiacos

- LEN Euroleague (1): 2001–02
- Greek Championship (7): 1993, 1995, 1996, 1999, 2000, 2001, 2002
- Greek Cup (5): 1993, 1997, 1998, 2001, 2002
- Greek Super Cup (2): 1997, 1998

=== National team ===
- (silver) Silver Medal in 1997 World Cup, Athens
- 6th place in 1996 Olympic Games, Atlanta

=== Individual ===
- 1997 World Cup Best Goalkeeper

== See also ==
- Greece men's Olympic water polo team records and statistics
- List of men's Olympic water polo tournament goalkeepers
