= Filippos Kaiafas =

Greek water polo player

Personal information
- Born: August 21, 1968 (age 57) Nea Ionia, Magnesia, Greece

Sport
- Club: Ethnikos Piraeus; Olympiacos; Ydraikos NO
Medal record
Men's Water polo
Representing Greece
World Cup
Silver medal – second place	1997 Athens	Team

Filippos Kaiafas ( Greek: Φίλιππος Καϊάφας; born 21 August 1968) is a Greek former water polo player who competed in the 1988 Summer Olympics, in the 1992 Summer Olympics, in the 1996 Summer Olympics, and in the 2000 Summer Olympics. He won two Greek championships with Ethnikos.

== Honours ==
- Greek Championship: 1988, 1994
- Greek Cup: 1988, 1991, 1998

== See also ==
- Greece men's Olympic water polo team records and statistics
- List of players who have appeared in multiple men's Olympic water polo tournaments
