= Sofia Iosifidou =

Greek water polo player

Personal information
- Born: 13 January 1981 (age 44); Piraeus, Greece

Sport
- Sport: Water polo

Sofia Iosifidou (Σοφία Ιωσηφίδου, born 13 January 1981) is a Greek former female water polo player. She was a member of the Greece women's national water polo team, playing as a centre back Water Polo.

== Career ==
She was a part of the team at the 2008 Summer Olympics. On club level she played for Ethnikos Piraeus and ANO glyfada in Greece and is one of the four who has winning Three European champions league and eight national champions.

== Family ==
Her father is water polo player Kyriakos Iosifidis, who was part of the Greece men's national water polo team at the 1968 and 1972 Summer Olympics. She is married with two children
