= Péter Rusorán =

Hungarian water polo player

Personal information
- Nationality: Hungarian
- Born: 11 April 1940 Budapest, Hungary
- Died: 14 February 2012 (aged 71) Paloznak, Hungary
- Height: 170 cm (5 ft 7 in)
- Weight: 69 kg (152 lb)

Sport
- Country: Hungary
- Sport: Water polo
- Retired: 1972
Medal record
Representing Hungary
Men's Water Polo
Olympic Games
Bronze medal – third place	1960 Rome	Team
Gold medal – first place	1964 Tokyo	Team
Summer Universidae
Gold medal – first place	1965 Budapest	Team

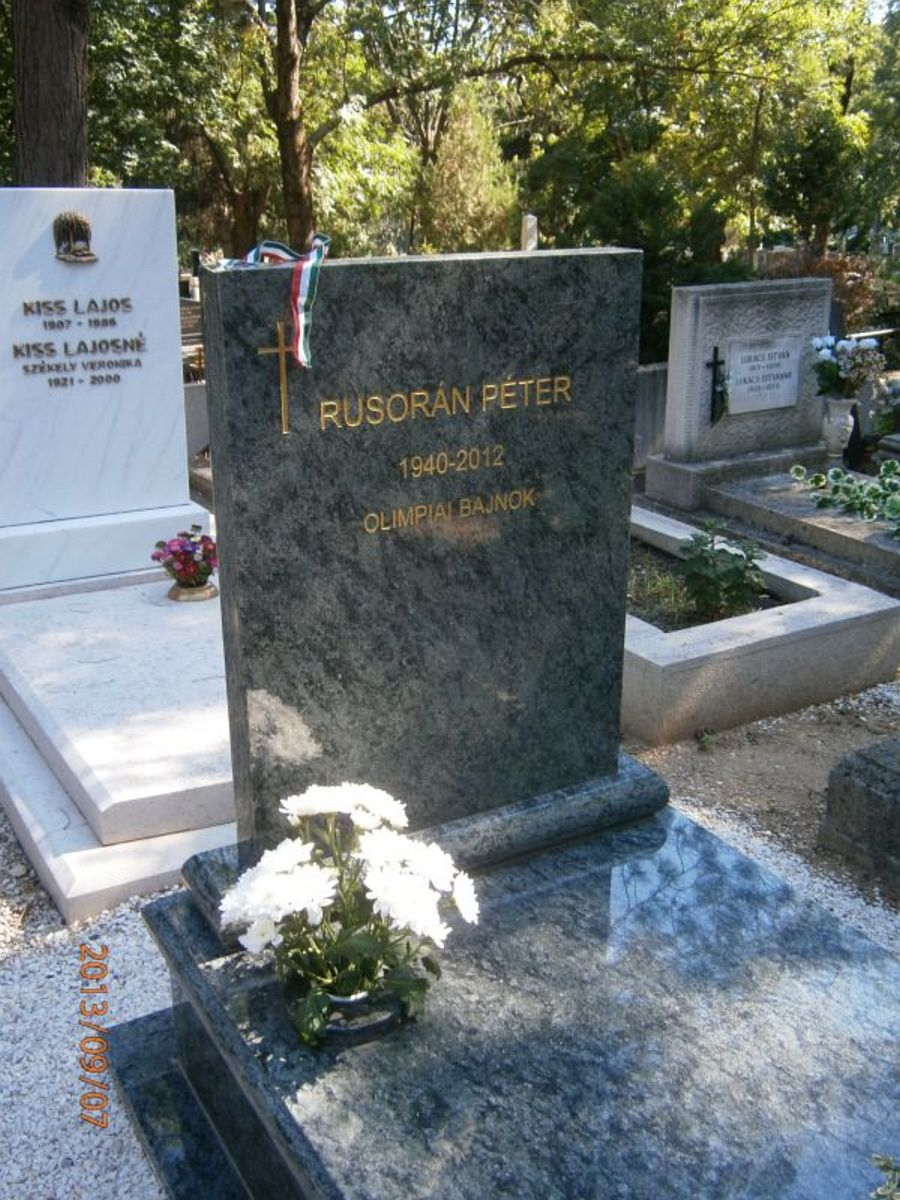

Péter Rusorán (11 April 1940 – 14 February 2012) was a Hungarian swimmer, water polo player and later water polo coach. As a player, he won the Olympic Games gold medal in 1964 and the bronze in 1960 and also obtained the Universiade title in 1965. As a coach, Rusorán won a number of national league titles both in Hungary and abroad and also triumphed on two occasions in the most prestigious continental competition, the European Champions Cup.

== Career ==
Rusorán was born in Budapest and began swimming and playing water polo at the age of nine by Fáklya Opera. In 1952 he switched to Vörös Meteor, and in 1961 to Csepel Autó. In 1969 he moved to Vasas SC, where he finished his playing career in 1972. On club level his biggest achievement is a Hungarian Cup title from 1971.

Rusorán played 103 times for the Hungarian water polo team between 1959 and 1968, and won the bronze medal at the 1960 Summer Olympics. He played two matches in the tournament and scored six goals. Four years later he was a member of the Hungarian team which won the gold medal in the 1964 Olympics. Rusorán contributed with eight goals in six matches to the success, and became the best Hungarian scorer of the championship. In 1965 he also won the Universiade held in his hometown Budapest.

=== Coaching ===
Following his retirement from professional sports, Rusorán took the head coaching position of Vasas SC and led them to seven Hungarian Championship titles. On the continental level he won two European Champions Cups in 1980 and 1985, and the Cup Winners' Cup in 1986. He had a short spell in Iran, where he managed the Iranian national team, and he also coached the Hungarian national team from 1983 to 1985, during which period Hungary won a silver medal at the 1983 World Championship.

Rusorán later coached Budapest-based Tungsram SC, and from the early nineties he worked abroad: first in Germany with record champions Wasserfreunde Spandau 04, then in Greece, where he coached Ethnikos Piraeus and finally in Switzerland with SVVC Morgan.

=== Retirement ===
After quitting water polo, Rusorán settled in Paloznak, a little village in the Bakony mountains. For his sporting achievements and his work for the village community he was awarded the honorary citizenship of Paloznak in 2010. He died on 14 February 2012 at the age of 71.

== See also ==
- Hungary men's Olympic water polo team records and statistics
- List of Olympic champions in men's water polo
- List of Olympic medalists in water polo (men)
