= Markellos Sitarenios =

Greek water polo player

Personal information
- Born: May 14, 1956 (age 70)

Sport
- Sport: Water polo

Markellos Sitarenios (born 14 May 1956) is a Greek former water polo player who competed in the 1980 Summer Olympics and in the 1984 Summer Olympics. He played at club level for Greek powerhouse Ethnikos Piraeus. He won 14 consecutive Greek championships and was the first Greek water polo player to play in the Italian league, where he played in 1985 with Polisportiva Anzio.

== Titles ==
=== With Ethnikos Piraeus ===
Greek championship (14): 1972, 1973, 1974, 1975, 1976, 1977, 1978, 1979, 1980, 1981, 1982, 1983, 1984, 1985

Greek cup (2): 1984, 1985
