= Nikolaos Tsangas =

Greek water polo player

Personal information
- Nationality: Greek
- Born: 26 November 1940 (age 84); Patras, Greece

Sport
- Sport: Water polo

Nikolaos Tsangas (born 26 November 1940) is a Greek former water polo player. He competed in the men's tournament at the 1968 Summer Olympics. He played for Ethnikos Piraeus in the 60's.
