= Nikitas Kocheilas =

Greek water polo player

Personal information
- Nationality: Greek
- Born: March 1, 1983 (age 43) Greece

Sport
- Sport: Water polo
Medal record
Men's water polo
Representing Greece
FINA World League
Bronze medal – third place	2006 Athens	Team competition
FINA Junior World Championships
Gold medal – first place	2001 Istanbul	Team competition

Nikitas Kocheilas (Greek: Νικήτας Κόχειλας; born 1 March 1983) is a Greek water polo player. As a member of Greece men's national water polo team, he won the bronze medal at the 2006 FINA World League and competed at the 2006 European Championship, the 2006 FINA World Cup and the 2008 FINA World League. Kocheilas was also part of the Greece men's national water polo team that was the Champion at the 2001 Junior World Championship in Istanbul.

At club level, Kocheilas started his career in 1998 with Ethnikos Piraeus (along with his brother Giannis) with whom he played from 1998 to 2003, 2015–2017 and 2021–2022 winning the 2000 Greek Cup. He played most notably also for Greek powerhouse Olympiacos from 2004 to 2011, winning 6 Greek Championships (2005, 2007–2011), 6 Greek Cups (2006, 2007–2011) and the fourth place at the 2006–07 LEN Euroleague. He has also played for Panathinaikos, PAOK, Palaio Faliro and Ydraikos.
