= Konstantinos Kokkinakis =

Greek water polo player

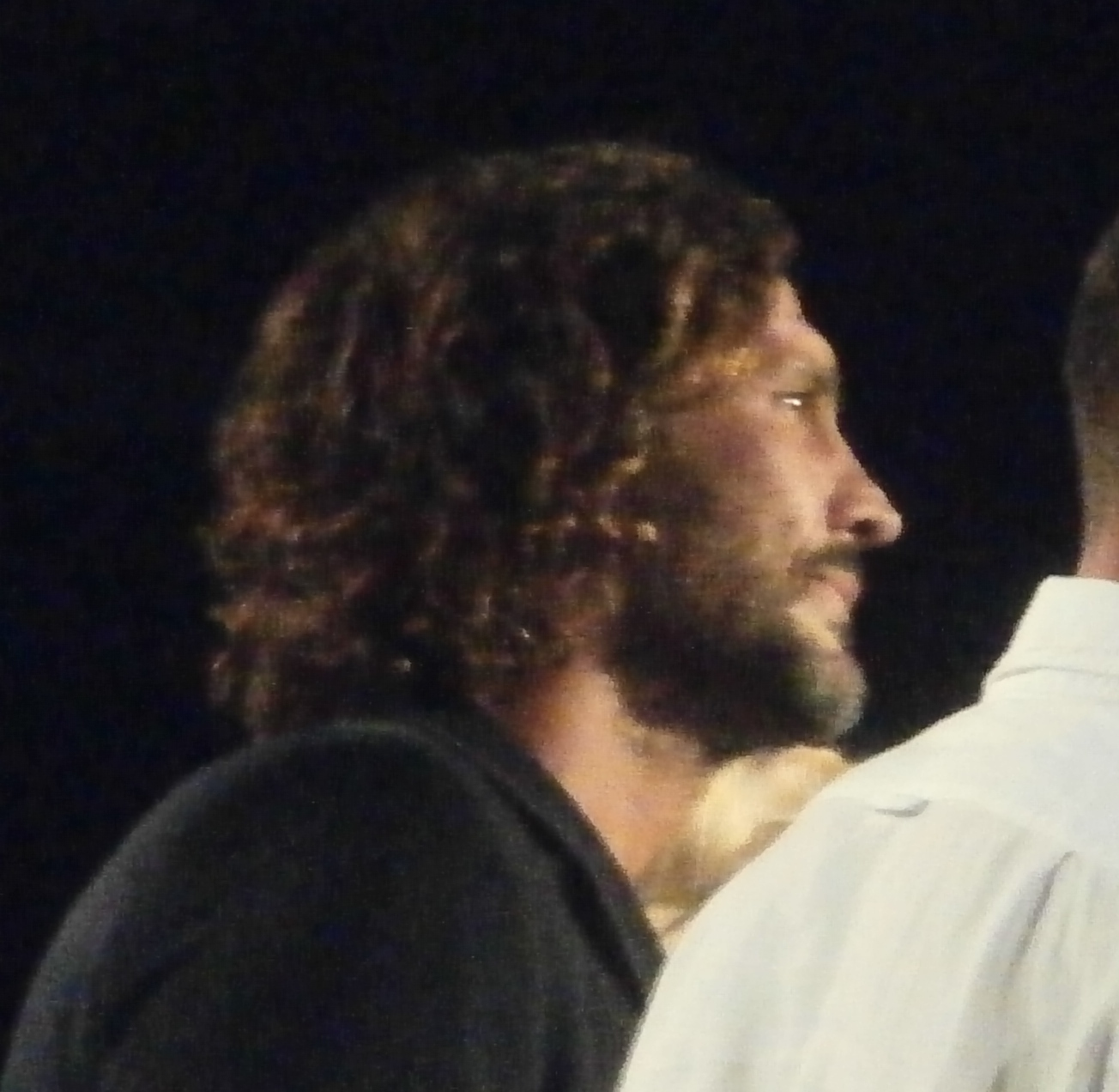
- Kostas Kokkinakis in 2017

Personal information
- Born: 9 October 1975 (age 50) Ioannina, Greece

Sport
- Sport: Water polo

Konstantinos Kokkinakis (Greek: Κωνσταντίνος Κοκκινάκης, born 9 October 1975) is a Greek water polo player who competed in the 2008 Summer Olympics and 2012 Summer Olympics. He played for Ethnikos (until 2008), Panionios (2008–2011), Panathinaikos (2011–2012), Nireas Lamias (2013–2014) and Ydraikos.

== Honours ==
Ethnikos Piraeus

- Greek Championship: 2006
- Greek Cup: 2000, 2005
- LEN Cup 3rd place: 2003

Panionios

- LEN Cup Finalist: 2009
