= Greece at the 1932 Summer Olympics =

- IOC code: GRE
- NOC: Committee of the Olympic Games

in Los Angeles United States
- Competitors: 10
- Flag bearer: Christos Mantikas
- Medals: Gold 0 Silver 0 Bronze 0 Total 0

Summer Olympics appearances (overview)
- 1896; 1900; 1904; 1908; 1912; 1920; 1924; 1928; 1932; 1936; 1948; 1952; 1956; 1960; 1964; 1968; 1972; 1976; 1980; 1984; 1988; 1992; 1996; 2000; 2004; 2008; 2012; 2016; 2020; 2024; 2028

Other related appearances
- 1906 Intercalated Games

Greece competed at the 1932 Summer Olympics in Los Angeles, United States. The Greek team participated to the Games, after a fundraising was organised by the Greek American Community to pay for the expenses of the travel. The best results were Gerogios Zervilis' and Ioannis Farmakidis' 5th place, both in Freestyle wrestling.
