= Theodoros Kalakonas =

Greek water polo player

Thodoris Kalakonas
Personal information
- Nationality: Greece
- Born: 28 October 1974 (age 51)

Sport
- Sport: Water polo
- Position: Wing

Senior clubs
- Years: Team
- –2001: Ethnikos
- 2001–2004: Olympiacos
- 2004–2006: Panionios
- 2006–?: Ethnikos
Medal record
Men's Water polo
Representing Greece
FINA World Cup
Silver medal – second place	1997 Athens	Team
World League
Bronze medal – third place	2004 Long Beach	Team

Theodoros "Thodoris" Kalakonas (born 28 October 1974) is a Greek water polo player who competed in the 1996 Summer Olympics (6th place), and in the 2004 Summer Olympics (4th place) with the Greece men's national water polo team. He was part of the national squad that won the silver medal at the 1997 World Cup in Athens and the Bronze Medal in the 2004 World League in Long Beach.

At club level, Kalakonas played most notably for Piraeus club Ethnikos (1990–2001, 2006–2008) with whom he is the all-time scorer in Piraeus Derby games for his team and one of the best scorers in the history of Ethnikos and Piraeuspowerhouse Olympiacos (2001–2004), with whom he won 1 LEN Champions League, 1 LEN Super Cup, 3 Greek Championships and 3 Greek Cups. Kalakonas was a key player in Olympiacos' 2002 Quardruple (LEN Champions League, LEN Super Cup, Greek Championship, Greek Cup all in 2002), being the top scorer of Olympiacos with 3 goals in the 2002 LEN Champions League final win (9–7) against Honvéd in Budapest.

He is the 10th all time scorer in Greek league history.

== Honours ==
=== Club ===
Ethnikos

- Greek Championship (1): 1994
- Greek Cup (2): 1991, 2000

Olympiacos

- LEN Euroleague (1): 2001–02
- LEN Super Cup (1): 2002
- Greek Championship (3): 2002, 2003, 2004
- Greek Cup (3): 2002, 2003, 2004

=== National team ===
- (silver) Silver Medal in 1997 World Cup, Athens
- (bronze) Bronze Medal in 2004 World League, Long Beach
- 4th place in 2004 Olympic Games, Athens
- 6th place in 1996 Olympic Games, Atlanta
- 4th place in 2003 World Championship, Barcelona
