= Ioannis Thymaras =

Greek water polo player (1934–2025)

Personal information
- Nationality: Greek
- Born: 1934 Spetses, Greece
- Died: August 2025 (aged 91)

Sport
- Sport: Water polo

Ioannis Thymaras (1934 – August 2025) was a Greek water polo player and coach. He competed in the men's tournament at the 1968 Summer Olympics. He was part of the legendary Ethnikos Piraeus team that won 18 consecutive championships (1953–1970) and stayed unbeaten for 13 years during the 1950s and 1960s. He played for Ethnikos from 1956 to 1969 and he was the coach for Ethnikos from 1973 to 1977. Thymaras died in August 2025, at the age of 91.

== See also ==
- Greece men's Olympic water polo team records and statistics
- List of men's Olympic water polo tournament goalkeepers
