= Antonios Aronis =

Greek water polo player

Personal information
- Born: March 17, 1957 (age 68)

Sport
- Sport: Water polo

Antonios Aronis (born 17 March 1957) is a Greek former water polo player who competed in the 1980 Summer Olympics, in the 1984 Summer Olympics, and in the 1988 Summer Olympics. He played for Greek powerhouses Ethnikos Piraeus and Olympiacos Piraeus. He won 14 trophies (11 championships) with Ethnikos and 4 (2 championships) with Olympiacos.

== Honours ==
=== With Ethnikos OFPF ===
- Greek Championship: 1976, 1977, 1978, 1979, 1980, 1981, 1982, 1983, 1984, 1985, 1988
- Greek Cup: 1984, 1985, 1988
- LEN Champions League 4th place: 1980

=== With Olympiacos SFP ===
- Greek Championship: 1992, 1993
- Greek Cup: 1992, 1993

== See also ==
- Greece men's Olympic water polo team records and statistics
- List of men's Olympic water polo tournament top goalscorers
