= Eleftherios Stefanoudakis =

Greek weightlifter (born 1949)

Personal information
- Nationality: Greek
- Born: 15 February 1949 (age 76); Chania, Greece

Sport
- Sport: Weightlifting

Eleftherios Stefanoudakis (born 15 February 1949) is a Greek weightlifter. He competed at the 1972 Summer Olympics and the 1976 Summer Olympics.
