= Ioannis Skarafingas =

Greek sport shooter

Ioannis Skarafigkas
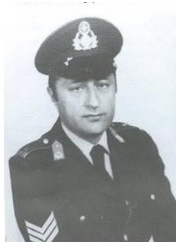

Personal information
- Nationality: Greece
- Born: Ioannis Evangelos Skarafigkas; 2 March 1935 (age 91) Fteri, Phthiotida, Greece
- Height: 6 ft 1 in (185 cm)
- Weight: 210 lb (95 kg)

Sport
- Sport: Sports shooting
- Event: 50 meter rifle prone

Ioannis Skarafigkas (born 2 March 1935) is a Greek former sports shooter. He joined the city police in 1958 and got involved in sport shooting in the sports department of the police. From 1962 to 1985 he competed in many Panhellenic championships until he retired. He turned professional and made the Greek Olympic Sport Shooting Team for the Small Bore Rifle category at 50 meters, and placed 48th in the 1968 Summer Olympics. In the 1972 Olympics he got 29th place. Ioannis’s last Olympic year in 1976 he placed 47th. He played alongside fellow Greek sports shooter, Lambis Manthos. He retired from professional sport shooting in 1985 and retired from the Greek Police in 1986 and now resides with his family in his hometown of Fteri, Pthiotida, Greece. He also participated in 2 Mediterranean competitions, 3 world championships, European championships, Latin championships and SISM world championships. Skarafigkas has also broken several national sports shooting records in Greece.
