= Mairi Ioannidou =

Greek swimmer

Personal information
- Born: 25 April 1952 (age 74)

Sport
- Sport: Swimming

Mairi Ioannidou (born 25 April 1952) is a Greek former swimmer. She competed in two events at the 1972 Summer Olympics.
