= Epaminondas Samartzidis =

Greek water polo player

Personal information
- Born: 9 September 1965 Serres, Greece
- Died: 22 June 1996 (aged 30) Palaia Epidavros, Greece

Sport
- Sport: Water polo, swimming

Epaminondas "Nondas" Samartzidis (9 September 1965 – 22 June 1996) was a Greek water polo player who competed in the 1988 Summer Olympics and in the 1992 Summer Olympics. He had 319 appearances for the Greece men's national water polo team. He started his career in Aris Thessaloniki. In 1985 final for the Greek Cup, Aris lost the final 8-7, but Samartzidis was the best player. The next season got transferred to powerhouse Ethnikos Piraeus where he won two championships (1988, 1994) and one Greek cup (1988). He had five gold medals in swimming (freestyle). He drowned on 22 June 1996 when he made free diving near to Palaia Epidavros. Samartzidis was the captain of the Greece, but he was expelled from the team in 1995 during the 1995 Men's European Water Polo Championship. The reason was that he visited his teammate Theodoros Kalakonas who was ill at the hospital, without the permission of Hellenic Swimming Federation's administrators.
