= Panagiotis Xanthakos =

Greek sports shooter (born 1948)

Personal information
- Born: 22 June 1948 (age 78) Athens, Greece

Sport
- Sport: Sports shooting

Panagiotis Xanthakos (born 22 June 1948) is a Greek former sports shooter. He competed in four Olympic Games.
