= Thomas Karalogos =

Greek water polo player

Personal information
- Born: August 5, 1951 (age 73); Piraeus, Greece

Sport
- Sport: Water polo
- Club: Ethnikos Piraeus

Thomas Karalogos (born 5 August 1951) is a Greek former water polo player who competed in the 1968 Summer Olympics, in the 1972 Summer Olympics, and in the 1980 Summer Olympics. He played at club level for Greek tradition water polo club Ethnikos Piraeus from 1966 to 1986 winning 19 Greek Championships and reaching the European Cup final four in 1980, the first time a Greek water polo team reached the final stage of the tournament.
