= Georgios Theodorakopoulos =

Greek water polo player

Personal information
- Born: January 23, 1944 (age 81); Kalavryta, Greece

Sport
- Sport: Water polo

Georgios Theodorakopoulos (born 23 January 1944) is a Greek former water polo player who competed in the 1968 Summer Olympics and in the 1972 Summer Olympics.
