= Dimitrios Kougevetopoulos =

Greek water polo player

Personal information
- Nationality: Greek
- Born: 21 May 1948 Athens, Greece
- Died: 11 May 2019 (aged 70) Athens, Greece

Sport
- Sport: Water polo

Dimitrios Kougevetopoulos (21 May 1948 – 11 May 2019) was a Greek water polo player. He competed at the 1968 Summer Olympics and the 1972 Summer Olympics. He played for Ethnikos Piraeus with whom he won multiple Greek championships from the 60s till the 80s.
