= Kyriakos Iosifidis =

Greek water polo player

Personal information
- Nickname: Koulis
- Born: January 27, 1946 (age 80) Piraeus, Greece
Medal record
Head Coach for Women's Water Polo
Representing Greece
Olympic Games
Silver medal – second place	2004 Athens	Team (coach)

Kyriakos "Koulis" Iosifidis (Greek: Κυριάκος Ιωσηφίδης, born 27 January 1946) is a retired Greek water polo player and water polo coach. As a player, he was part of the Greece men's national water polo team at the 1968 and 1972 Olympic Games. and at club level member of Greek powerhouse Ethnikos Piraeus with whom he won 19 Greek Championships between 1964 and 1983.

Iosifidis was the head coach of Greece women's national water polo team that won the silver medal at the 2004 Summer Olympics in Athens.
