= Andreas Garyfallos =

Greek water polo player

Personal information
- Nationality: Greek
- Born: 1929 Piraeus, Greece
- Died: 17 February 2015 (aged 85–86)

Sport
- Sport: Water polo
- Club: Ethnikos (1947–1968)

Andreas Garyfallos (1929 – 17 February 2015) was a Greek water polo player, one of the greatest in the history of Greek water polo as he is considered the "Patriarch of Greek water polo". He competed in the men's tournament at the 1968 Summer Olympics as a player-coach.

He won 17 Greek Championships during the 1947 to 1968 span (all of them without defeat except for 1964 and 1968) and 6 consecutive Greek Cups (1953-1958) with Ethnikos Piraeus.

He was later head coach of Kerkyra NC, Aris Thessaloniki, Panathinaikos, Ethnikos, NC Chios, Iraklis Thessaloniki.

He also held the position of Ethnikos's president.

The swimming pool in the Votsalakia beach in Piraeus bears his name.

== Honours ==
17 Greek Championships

- 1948, 1953, 1954, 1955, 1956, 1957, 1958, 1959, 1960, 1961, 1962, 1963, 1964, 1965, 1966, 1967, 1968

6 Greek Cups

- 1953, 1954, 1955, 1956, 1957, 1958
