= Lambis Manthos =

Greek sports shooter

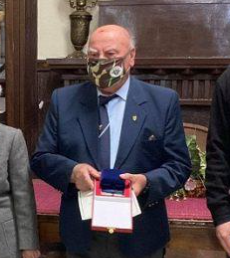

Personal information
- Full name: Evlambios Manthos
- Nationality: Greece
- Born: 30 January 1934 (age 92) Kastritsa, Greece
- Height: 5 ft 6 in (168 cm)
- Weight: 166 lb (75 kg)

Sport
- Sport: Sports shooting
- Event: 50 meter rifle prone

Lambis Manthos (born 30 January 1934) is a Greek former sports shooter. He competed at 1964, 1968, 1972 and 1976 Summer Olympics.
