= Soling European Championship results (1980–1984) =

Soling European Championships

Soling
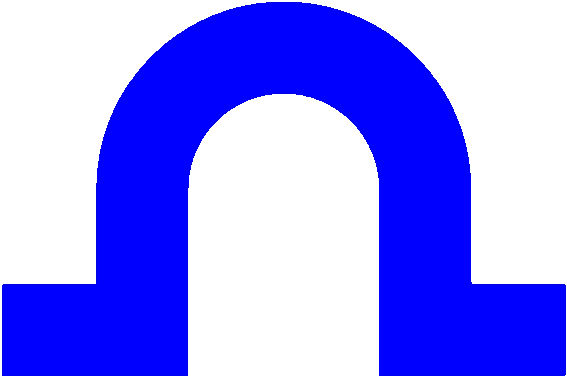

Development
- Name: Soling

The main article describes all European Soling Championships from one the first held in 1968 to the announced Championships in the near future. This article states the detailed results, where relevant the controversies, and the progression of the Championship during the series race by race of the European Soling Championships in the years 1980, 1981, 1982, 1983 and 1984. This is based on the major sources: World Sailing, the world governing body for the sport of sailing recognized by the IOC and the IPC, and the publications of the International Soling Association. Unfortunately not all crew names are documented in the major sources.

== 1980 Final results ==
1980
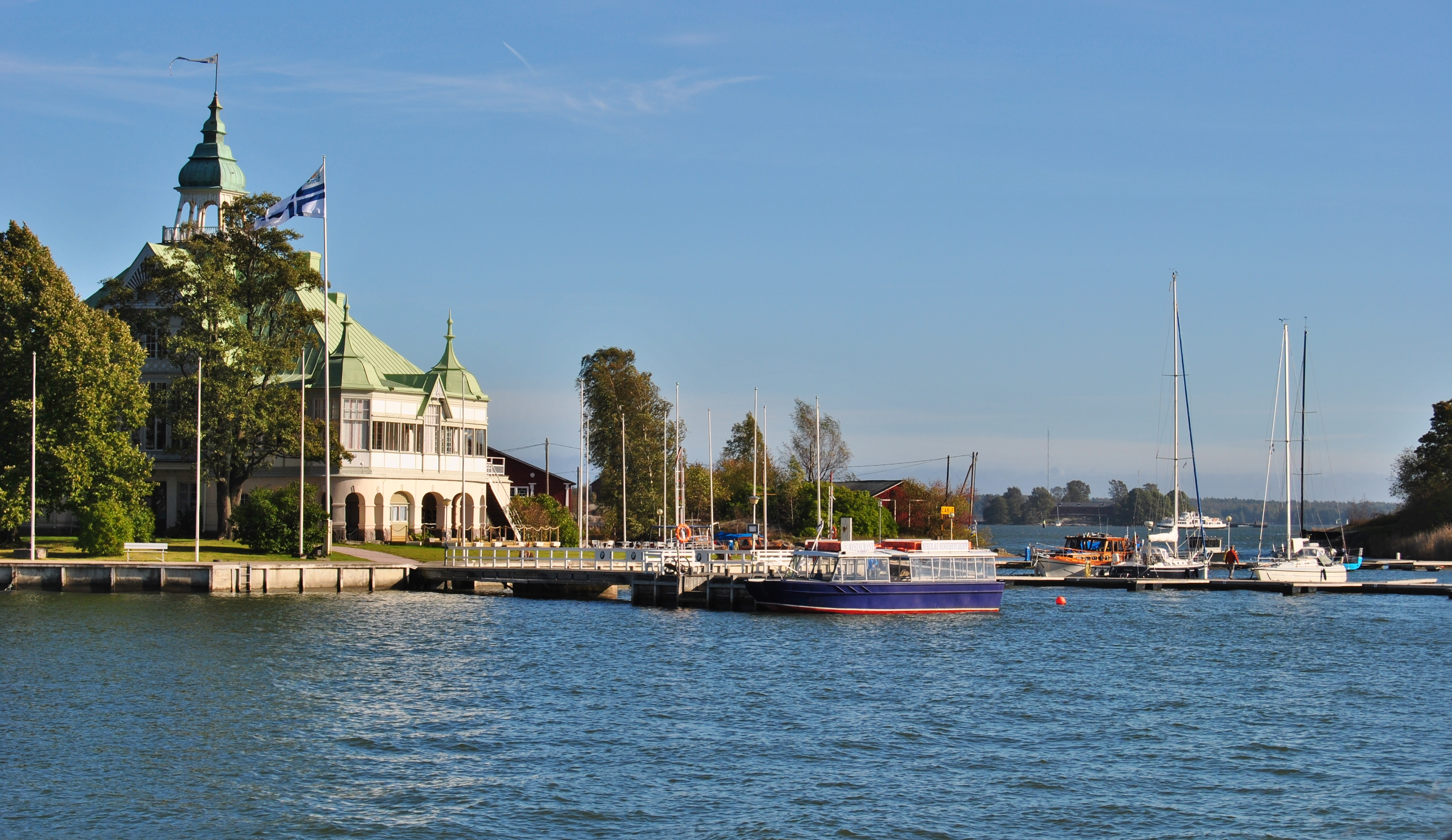

Event title
- Edition: 13
- Host: Nyländska Jaktklubben

Event details
- Venue: Helsinki, Finland
- Dates: 4–13 June
- Yachts: 40
- Opening ceremony: 6 June

Competitors
- Competitors: 120
- Competing nations: 13

Results
- (gold) Gold: Soviet Union; Boris Budnikov; Aleksandr Budnikov; Nikolay Polyakov
- (silver) Silver: West Germany; Willi Kuhweide; Eckart Loell; Sebastian Ziegelmayer
- (bronze) Bronze: Denmark; Poul Richard Høj Jensen; Valdemar Bandolowski; Erik Hermann Hansen

After the last race the International Jury needed three hours to make the decision about three boats that passed between the control boat and the gate launch during a gate start in race 6. One of them was the team of SR 27 Boris Budnikov. The final decision was that these three competitors retain their place as finished.

Detailed results are documented of the top 10 teams. The ranking and the net total of the other competitors is also documented.

Rank	Country	Helmsman	Crew	Sail No.	Race 1		Race 2		Race 3		Race 4		Race 5		Race 6		Race 7		Total	Total – discard
Rank	Country	Helmsman	Crew	Sail No.	Pos.	Pts.	Pos.	Pts.	Pos.	Pts.	Pos.	Pts.	Pos.	Pts.	Pos.	Pts.	Pos.	Pts.	Total	Total – discard
1st place, gold medalist(s)	URS	Boris Budnikov	Aleksandr Budnikov; Nikolay Polyakov	SR 27	7	13.0	~~28~~	~~34.0~~	4	8.0	2	3.0	3	5.7	14	20.0	8	14.0	97.7	63.7
2nd place, silver medalist(s)	FRG	Willi Kuhweide	Eckart Loell; Sebastian Ziegelmayer	G 205	2	3.0	17	23.0	7	13.0	~~24~~	~~30.0~~	2	3.0	2	3.0	15	21.0	96.0	66.0
3rd place, bronze medalist(s)	DEN	Poul Richard Høj Jensen	Valdemar Bandolowski; Erik Hermann Hansen	D 80	~~PMS~~	~~47.0~~	16	22.0	30	36.0	1	0.0	1	0.0	1	0.0	5	10.0	115.0	68.0
4	FRG	Fritz Geis	Nomen Nescio	G 212	12	18.0	2	3.0	~~17~~	~~23.0~~	12	18.0	15	21.0	5	10.0	1	0.0	93.0	70.0
5	SWE	Jörgen Sundelin	Ulf Sundelin; Peter Sundelin	S 119	18	24.0	1	0.0	6	11.7	6	11.7	18	24.0	3	5.7	~~26~~	~~32.0~~	109.1	77.1
6	GDR	Dieter Below	Bernd Klenke; Michael Zachries	GO 1	13	19.0	6	11.7	5	10.0	~~15~~	~~21.0~~	4	8.0	9	15.0	11	17.0	101.7	80.7
7	GBR	Philip Crebbin	Nomen nescio	K 138	5	10.0	15	21.0	1	0.0	5	10.0	7	13.0	21	27.0	~~23~~	~~29.0~~	110.0	81.0
8	SWE	Jan Andersson	Bertil Larsson; Göran Andersson	S 118	~~30~~	~~36.0~~	4	8.0	8	14.0	4	8.0	19	25.0	12	18.0	4	8.0	117.0	81.0
9	CAN	Bill Abbott Jr.	Bill Abbott Sr. Phil Bissell	KC 1	4	8.0	19	25.0	2	3.0	~~26~~	~~32.0~~	14	20.0	16	22.0	7	13.0	123.0	91.0
10	GDR	Wolf Richter	Nomen nescio	GO 5	15	21.0	3	5.7	~~31~~	~~37.0~~	17	23.0	9	15.0	18	24.0	3	5.7	131.4	94.4
11	URS	Eugenij Kudriavtsev	Nomen nescio	SR 29	-	-	-	-	-	-	-	-	-	-	-	-	-	-	-	96.0
12	NOR	Odd Roar Lofterød	Nomen nescio	N 93	-	-	-	-	-	-	-	-	-	-	-	-	-	-	-	105.7
13	FRG	Erich Hirt	Nomen nescio	G 219	-	-	-	-	-	-	-	-	-	-	-	-	-	-	-	105.7
14	URS	Oleg Spolon	Nomen nescio	SR 25	-	-	-	-	-	-	-	-	-	-	-	-	-	-	-	110.0
15	NOR	Hans Wang	Nomen nescio	N 89	-	-	-	-	-	-	-	-	-	-	-	-	-	-	-	121.0
16	FRA	Patrick Haegeli	Nomen nescio	F 142	-	-	-	-	-	-	-	-	-	-	-	-	-	-	-	130.6
17	SWE	Erik Thorsell	Nomen nescio	S 122	-	-	-	-	-	-	-	-	-	-	-	-	-	-	-	133.0
18	NED	Geert Bakker	Dick Coster; Steven Bakker	H 22	-	-	-	-	-	-	-	-	-	-	-	-	-	-	-	134.0
19	FIN	Kurt Nyman	Nomen nescio	L 44	-	-	-	-	-	-	-	-	-	-	-	-	-	-	-	140.7
20	FRA	Bertrand Cheret	Nomen nescio	F 143	-	-	-	-	-	-	-	-	-	-	-	-	-	-	-	143.0
21	FRG	Rainer Niemann	Nomen nescio	G 185	-	-	-	-	-	-	-	-	-	-	-	-	-	-	-	145.7
22	SWE	Arved von Grünewaldt	Nomen nescio	S 115	-	-	-	-	-	-	-	-	-	-	-	-	-	-	-	147.0
23	FIN	Matti Jokinen	Nomen nescio	L 42	-	-	-	-	-	-	-	-	-	-	-	-	-	-	-	149.0
24	FIN	Sam Hartikainen	Nomen nescio	L 41	-	-	-	-	-	-	-	-	-	-	-	-	-	-	-	152.7
25	SWE	Anders Rydin	Nomen nescio	S 48	-	-	-	-	-	-	-	-	-	-	-	-	-	-	-	154.7
26	GBR	Colin Simonds	Nomen nescio	K 133	-	-	-	-	-	-	-	-	-	-	-	-	-	-	-	155.7
27	POL	Z. Parlicki	Nomen nescio	PZ 7	-	-	-	-	-	-	-	-	-	-	-	-	-	-	-	156.0
28	POL	Jan Bartosik	Zdzisław Kotla; Jerzy Wujecki	PZ 4	-	-	-	-	-	-	-	-	-	-	-	-	-	-	-	156.0
29	FRA	René Sence	Nomen nescio	F 140	-	-	-	-	-	-	-	-	-	-	-	-	-	-	-	163.0
30	JPN	Shigezi Hidaka	Nomen nescio	J 17	-	-	-	-	-	-	-	-	-	-	-	-	-	-	-	167.0
31	FIN	J. Okkonen	Nomen nescio	L 45	-	-	-	-	-	-	-	-	-	-	-	-	-	-	-	184.0
32	FIN	S. Osanen	Nomen nescio	L 34	-	-	-	-	-	-	-	-	-	-	-	-	-	-	-	187.0
33	FIN	E. Aikala	Nomen nescio	L 35	-	-	-	-	-	-	-	-	-	-	-	-	-	-	-	203.0
34	FIN	P. Okkonen	Nomen nescio	L 30	-	-	-	-	-	-	-	-	-	-	-	-	-	-	-	206.0
35	FIN	G. Mellin	Nomen nescio	L 32	-	-	-	-	-	-	-	-	-	-	-	-	-	-	-	207.0
36	FIN	P. Ahlaman	Nomen nescio	L 37	-	-	-	-	-	-	-	-	-	-	-	-	-	-	-	225.0
37	SWE	W. Horstall	Nomen nescio	S 121	-	-	-	-	-	-	-	-	-	-	-	-	-	-	-	230.4
38	NOR	John O'Sullivan	Nomen nescio	N 69	-	-	-	-	-	-	-	-	-	-	-	-	-	-	-	243.0
39	FIN	B. Michelsson	Nomen nescio	L 10	-	-	-	-	-	-	-	-	-	-	-	-	-	-	-	254.0
40	FIN	R. Siljander	Nomen nescio	L 46	-	-	-	-	-	-	-	-	-	-	-	-	-	-	-	263.0

Legend: DNF – Did not finish; DNS – Did not start; DSQ – Disqualified;
Discard is crossed out and does not count for the overall result.

- 1980 Progress

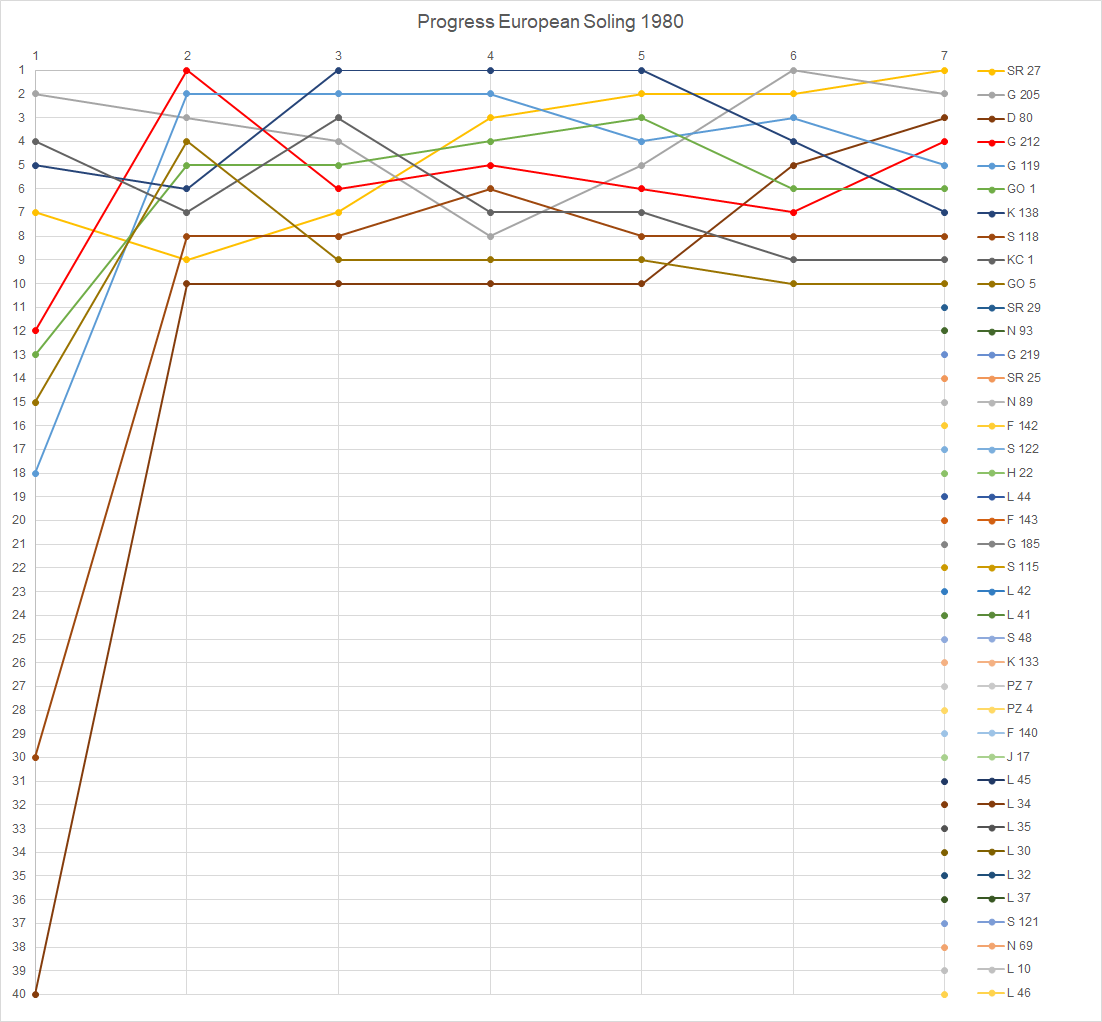

== 1981 Final results ==
1981
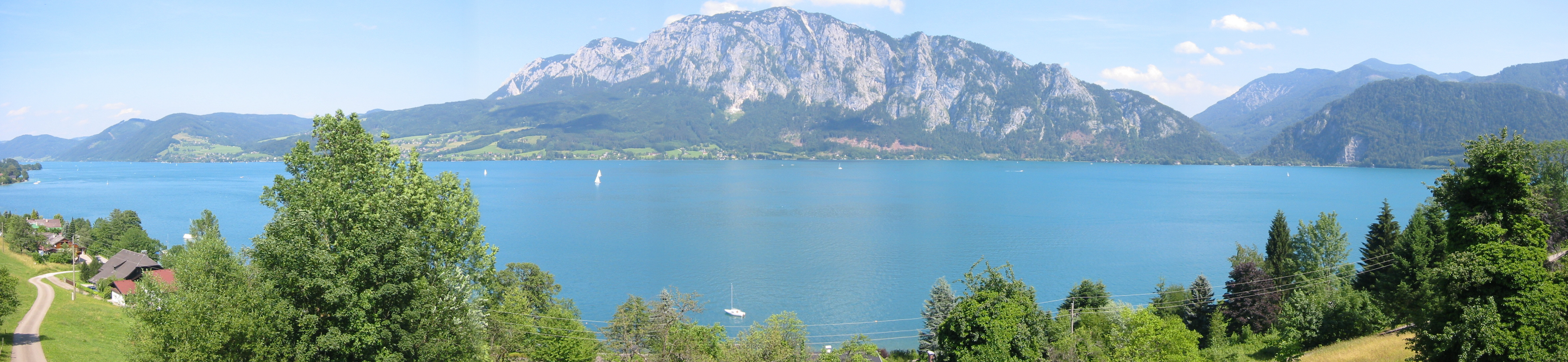

Event title
- Edition: 14
- Host: Union-Yacht-Club Attersee

Event details
- Venue: Attersee, Austria
- Dates: 30 August - 6 September
- Yachts: 43
- Opening ceremony: 31 August

Competitors
- Competitors: 129
- Competing nations: 13

Results
- (gold) Gold: Austria; Michael Farthofer; Georg Vartian; Christian Holler
- (silver) Silver: East Germany; Jörg Hermann; B. Becker; Carl Olbrich
- (bronze) Bronze: West Germany; Fritz Geis; Richard Fricke; Karl Fricke

During Race 6 a team member of Z 232 team Heiki Blok felt overboard and was pickup and returned to his teammates by G 212 team Fritz Geis at that time leader in the event. This very sportive action of G 212 was rewarded by the International jury, after the final race, by reducing his finished position by 5 places. In the final race the both leaders G 212 and OE 73 team Michael Farthofer went over the starting line too early and were disqualified. Team Jörg Hermann DDR 5 then needed a 2nd place to win the event. They however finished 4th and 2nd in the overall ranking.

Rank	Country	Helmsman	Crew	Sail No.	Race 1		Race 2		Race 3		Race 4		Race 5		Race 6		Race 7		Total	Total – discard
Rank	Country	Helmsman	Crew	Sail No.	Pos.	Pts.	Pos.	Pts.	Pos.	Pts.	Pos.	Pts.	Pos.	Pts.	Pos.	Pts.	Pos.	Pts.	Total	Total – discard
1	AUT	Michael Farthofer	Christian Holler; Georg Vartian	OE 73	4	8.0	18	24.0	2	3.0	9	15.0	1	0.0	1	0.0	~~PMS~~	~~50.0~~	100.0	50.0
2	GDR	Jörg Hermann	B. Becker; Carl Olbrich	DDR 5	~~26~~	~~32.0~~	3	5.7	16	22.0	2	3.0	2	3.0	7	13.0	4	8.0	86.7	54.7
3	FRG	Fritz Geis	Richard Fricke; Karl Fricke	G 212	1	0.0	1	0.0	1	0.0	15	21.0	3	5.7	YMP	29.0	~~PMS~~	~~50.0~~	105.7	55.7
4	FRG	Erich Hirt	Nomen nescio	G 219	3	5.7	~~DSQ~~	~~50.0~~	5	10.0	12	18.0	19	25.0	11	17.0	1	0.0	125.7	75.7
5	ITA	Gianluca Lamaro	Valerio Romano; Aurelio Dalla Vecchia	I 154	9	15.0	2	3.0	3	5.7	~~16~~	~~22.0~~	15	21.0	8	14.0	11	17.0	97.7	75.7
6	FRG	Willi Kuhweide	Eckart Loell; Sebastian Ziegelmayer	G 205	8	14.0	7	13.0	8	14.0	8	14.0	13	19.0	5	10.0	~~17~~	~~23.0~~	107	84
7	FRG	Karl Haist	Nomen nescio	G 208	5	10.0	10	16.0	17	23.0	13	19.0	9	15.0	~~21~~	~~27.0~~	2	3.0	113.0	86.0
8	FRG	Roman Koch	Maxl Koch; Nomen nescio	G 177	~~DNS~~	~~50.0~~	5	10.0	6	11.7	3	5.7	32	38.0	10	16.0	5	10.0	141.4	91.4
9	GDR	Wolf Richter	Bernd Jäkel; Norbert Hellriegel	DDR 1	2	3.0	~~23~~	~~29.0~~	14	20.0	1	0.0	20	26.0	13	19.0	23	29.0	126.0	97.0
10	DEN	Peter Kampmann	Nomen nescio	D 81	14	20.0	~~25~~	~~31.0~~	15	21.0	17	23.0	16	22.0	4	8.0	12	18.0	143.0	112.0
11	FRG	Thomas Jungblut	Nomen nescio	G 232	30	36.0	~~36~~	~~42.0~~	4	8.0	23	29.0	4	8.0	2	3.0	25	31.0	157.0	115.0
12	NOR	Hans Wang	Nomen nescio	N 96	10	16.0	12	18.0	~~32~~	~~38.0~~	6	11.7	17	23.0	9	15.0	29	35.0	156.7	118.7
13	AUT	Carl Auteried Jr.	Nomen nescio	OE 70	28	34.0	11	17.0	~~29~~	~~35.0~~	10	16.0	7	13.0	3	5.7	28	34.0	154.7	119.7
14	FRG	Curt Noel	Nomen nescio	G 229	11	17.0	6	11.7	25	31.0	11	17.0	~~33~~	~~39.0~~	16	22.0	15	21.0	158.7	119.7
15	AUT	Oskar Bilik	Nomen nescio	OE 76	15	21.0	15	21.0	10	16.0	21	27.0	~~25~~	~~31.0~~	12	18.0	13	19.0	153.0	122.0
16	SUI	Alain Testuz	Nomen nescio	Z 258	20	26.0	26	32.0	7	13.0	4	8.0	~~40~~	~~46.0~~	26	32.0	9	15.0	172.0	126.0
17	AUT	Rupert Engl	Nomen nescio	OE 60	13	19.0	13	19.0	19	25.0	~~34~~	~~40.0~~	14	20.0	17	23.0	14	20.0	166.0	126.0
18	AUT	Uli Strohschneider	Nomen nescio	OE 58	~~25~~	~~31.0~~	22	28.0	18	24.0	18	24.0	23	29.0	6	11.7.0	7	13.0	160.7	129.7
19	POL	Jan Bartosik	Nomen nescio	PZ 4	7	13.0	16	22.0	~~31~~	~~37.0~~	14	20.0	10	16.0	19	25.0	30	36.0	169.0	132.0
20	DEN	Valdemar Bandolowski	Nomen nescio	D 82	35	41.0	21	27.0	11	17.0	~~27~~	~~33.0~~	6	11.7	18	24.0	19	25.0	178.7	137.7
21	NOR	Terje Wang	Nomen nescio	N 98	18	24.0	14	20.0	~~39~~	~~45.0~~	5	10.0	26	32.0	14	20.0	33	39.0	190.0	145.0
22	FRG	Daniel Diesing	Nomen nescio	G 135	33	39.0	29	35.0	3	5.7	7	13.0	~~DNF~~	~~50.0~~	DNF	50.0	3	5.7	198.4	148.4
23	FRG	Eckart Wagner	Nomen nescio	G 171	6	11.7	17	23.0	22	28.0	22	28.0	31	37.0	23	29.0	~~DNF~~	~~50.0~~	206.7	156.7
24	NED	Geert Bakker	Dick Coster; Pieter Keijzer	H 22	16	22.0	20	26.0	13	19.0	~~PMS~~	~~50.0~~	11	17.0	34	40.0	27	33.0	207.0	157.0
25	FIN	J. Okkonen	Nomen nescio	L 45	29	35.0	4	8.0	35	41.0	~~40~~	~~46.0~~	5	10.0	36	42.0	22	28.0	210.0	164.0
26	GBR	Barry Dunning	Nomen nescio	K 135	38	44.0	9	15.0	40	46.0	~~PMS~~	~~50.0~~	18	24.0	20	26.0	10	16.0	221.0	171.0
27	FRG	Thomas Maschkiwitz	Nomen nescio	G 226	~~DNF~~	~~50.0~~	34	40.0	36	42.0	25	31.0	8	14.0	27	33.0	6	11.7	221.7	171.7
28	NED	Rudy den Outer	Siebe Sonnema; Feico Bakker	H 17	24	30.0	30	36.0	30	36.0	24	30.0	22	28.0	~~33~~	~~39.0~~	8	14.0	213.0	174.0
29	NOR	Kalle Nergaard	Kristian Nergaard; Nomen nescio	N 87	21	27.0	~~38~~	~~44.0~~	12	18.0	33	39.0	35	41.0	15	21.0	31	37.0	227.0	183.0
30	AUT	Peter Menzel	Nomen nescio	OE 51	12	18.0	19	25.0	28	34.0	28	34.0	~~39~~	~~45.0~~	29	35.0	32	38.0	229.0	184.0
31	GBR	Tony Clare	Nomen nescio	K 136	17	23.0	31	37.0	23	29.0	19	25.0	~~37~~	~~43.0~~	25	31.0	35	41.0	229.0	186.0
32	DEN	Per Buch	Nomen nescio	D 70	32	38.0	27	33.0	26	32.0	32	38.0	~~41~~	~~47.0~~	22	28.0	16	22.0	238.0	191.0
33	DEN	Torsten Rasmussen	Nomen nescio	D 77	~~37~~	~~43.0~~	25	31.0	20	26.0	29	35.0	24	30.0	24	30.0	34	40.0	235.0	192.0
34	FIN	Jorinen	Nomen nescio	L 42	36	42.0	32	38.0	24	30.0	20	26.0	~~36~~	~~42.0~~	30	36.0	24	30.0	244.0	202.0
35	DEN	Kold	Nomen nescio	D 80	31	37.0	35	41.0	21	27.0	36	42.0	12	18.0	39	45.0	~~DNF~~	~~50.0~~	260.0	210.0
36	SUI	Heiki Blok	Nomen nescio	Z 249	23	29.0	~~39~~	~~45.0~~	37	43.0	31	37.0	30	36.0	32	38.0	26	32.0	260.0	215.0
37	NOR	Hostmark	Nomen nescio	N 91	22	28.0	33	39.0	~~42~~	~~48.0~~	26	32.0	38	44.0	40	46.0	35	41.0	278.0	230.0
38	AUT	Franz Wageneder	Nomen nescio	OE 36	17	23.0	~~40~~	~~46.0~~	33	39.0	38	44.0	28	34.0	37	43.0	18	24.0	253.0	207.0
39	SWE	Hans Gustavsson	Nomen nescio	S 83	19	25.0	37	43.0	36	42.0	30	36.0	29	35.0	31	37.0	~~DNS~~	~~50.0~~	268.0	218.0
40	FRG	Hirschfeld	Nomen nescio	G 228	39	45.0	8	14.0	27	33.0	35	41.0	34	40.0	38	44.0	~~DNF~~	~~50.0~~	267.0	217.0
41	AUT	Nikki Seemann	Nomen nescio	OE 38	34	40.0	24	30.0	38	44.0	37	43.0	27	33.0	~~41~~	~~47.0~~	21	27.0	264.0	217.0
42	FRA	Chevier	Nomen nescio	F 145	41	47.0	42	48.0	41	47.0	39	45.0	21	27.0	35	41.0	~~DNF~~	~~50.0~~	305.0	255.0
43	AUT	Rudolf Schuh	Nomen nescio	OE 59	40	46.0	41	47.0	~~43~~	~~49.0~~	41	47.0	42	48.0	42	48.0	36	42.0	327.0	278.0

Legend: DNF – Did not finish; DNS – Did not start; DSQ – Disqualified; PMS – Premature start;
Discard is crossed out and does not count for the overall result.

- 1981 Progress

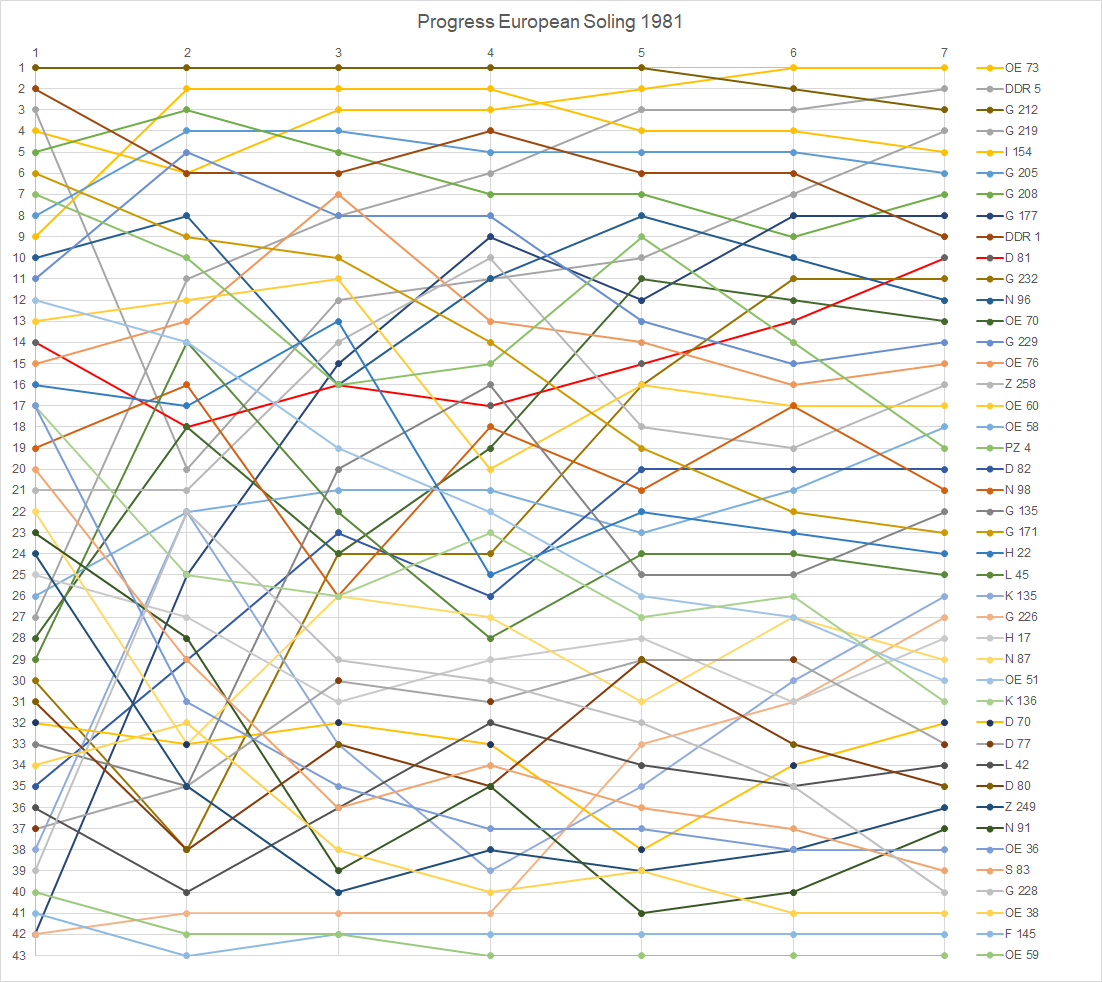

== 1982 Final results ==
1982
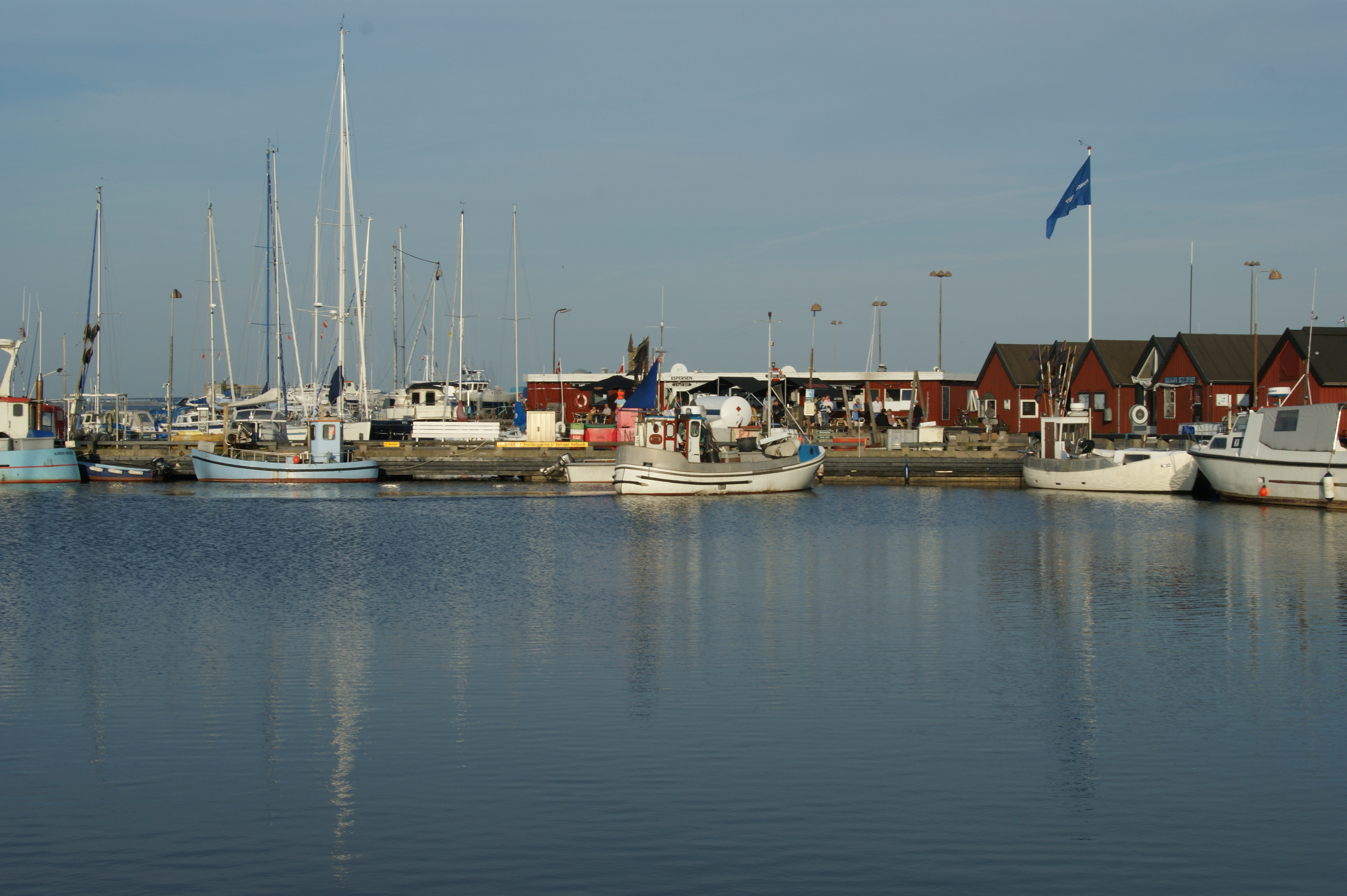

Event title
- Edition: 15
- Host: Dragør Sejlklub

Event details
- Venue: Dragør, Denmark
- Dates: 11–19 September
- Yachts: 51
- Opening ceremony: 13 September

Competitors
- Competitors: 153
- Competing nations: 15

Results
- (gold) Gold: Canada; Hans Fogh; Poul Richard Høj Jensen; John Kerr
- (silver) Silver: Soviet Union; Boris Budnikov; Aleksandr Budnikov; Nikolay Polyakov
- (bronze) Bronze: Soviet Union; Eugenij Kudriavtsev; Nomen nescio

Due to difficult race conditions the Dragør Sejlklub race committee needed to use the gate start procedure and the black flag rule many times during this event. The committee finally was able to produce five great races. Two races could not take place. As result there was no discard.

Rank	Country	Helmsman	Crew	Sail No.	Race 1		Race 2		Race 3		Race 4		Race 5		Total
Rank	Country	Helmsman	Crew	Sail No.	Pos.	Pts.	Pos.	Pts.	Pos.	Pts.	Pos.	Pts.	Pos.	Pts.	Total
1st place, gold medalist(s)	CAN	Hans Fogh	Poul Richard Høj Jensen; John Kerr	KC 169	11	17.0	2	3.0	6	11.7	5	10.0	1	0.0	41.7
2nd place, silver medalist(s)	URS	Boris Budnikov	Aleksandr Budnikov; Nikolay Polyakov	SR 27	2	3.0	13	19.0	2	3.0	2	3.0	18	24.0	52.0
3rd place, bronze medalist(s)	URS	Eugenij Kudriavtsev	Nomen nescio	SR 29	26	32.0	7	13.0	3	5.7	4	8.0	5	10.0	68.7
4	FRG	Fritz Geis	Richard Fricke; Karl Fricke	G 212	1	0.0	28	34.0	20	26.0	1	0.0	6	11.7	71.7
5	BRA	Torben Grael	Daniel Adler; Ronaldo Senfft	BL 42	7	13.0	11	17.0	4	8.0	6	11.7	21	27.0	76.7
6	AUT	Michael Farthofer	Christian Holler; Georg Vartian	OE 73	5	10.0	45	51.0	1	0.0	12	18.0	2	3.0	82.0
7	SWE	Valter Saaristu	Nomen nescio	S 121	22	28.0	6	11.7	18	24.0	10	16.0	14	20.0	99.7
8	SWE	Jan Andersson	Nomen nescio	S 118	19	25.0	5	10.0	12	18.0	16	22.0	20	26.0	101.0
9	DEN	Peter Kampmann	Nomen nescio	D 81	3	5.7	21	27.0	32	38.0	15	21.0	10	16.0	107.7
10	NED	Geert Bakker	Rolf Heemskerk; Rudy den Outer	H 22	24	30.0	38	44.0	11	17.0	11	17.0	4	8.0	116.0
11	FRG	Thomas Jungblut	Nomen nescio	G 232	10	16.0	24	30.0	17	23.0	23	29.0	13	19.0	117.0
12	NED	Steven Bakker	Gijs Evers; Nomen nescio	H 17	25	31.0	14	20.0	38	44.0	7	13.0	8	14.0	122.0
13	GDR	Wolf Richter	Nomen nescio	DDR 1	4	8.0	16	22.0	DSQ	60.0	3	5.7	22	28.0	123.7
14	ITA	Giuseppe Milone	Nomen nescio	I 223	16	22.0	10	16.0	5	10.0	33	39.0	31	37.0	124.0
15	FRG	Willi Kuhweide	Eckart Loell; Sebastian Ziegelmayer	G 205	6	11.7	27	33.0	13	19.0	22	28.0	27	33.0	124.7
16	DEN	Jesper Bank	Nomen nescio	D 83	18	24.0	3	5.7	19	25.0	38	44.0	28	34.0	132.7
17	DEN	William Frits Moller	Nomen nescio	D 85	DSQ	60.0	1	0.0	22	28.0	34	40.0	3	5.7	133.7
18	GDR	Helmar Nauck	Norbert Hellriegel; Sven Diedering	DDR 4	8	14.0	26	32.0	8	14.0	28	34.0	36	42.0	136.0
19	SWE	Arwed von Gruenewaldt	Nomen nescio	S 127	35	41.0	18	24.0	15	21.0	26	32.0	12	18.0	136.0
20	GBR	Ted Fort	Nomen nescio	K 127	46	52.0	4	8.0	14	20.0	36	42.0	9	15.0	137.0
21	GBR	Chris Law	Nomen nescio	K 139	YMP	21.0	20	26.0	7	13.0	13	19.0	DSQ	60.0	139.0
22	ITA	Gianluca Lamaro	Valerio Romano; Aurelio Dalla Vecchia	I 222	15	21.0	9	15.0	25	31.0	9	15.0	DSQ	60.0	142.0
23	SWE	Jörgen Sundelin	Ulf Sundelin; Peter Sundelin	S 119	12	18.0	31	37.0	42	48.0	25	31.0	7	13.0	147.0
24	AUT	Carl Auteried Jr.	Nomen nescio	OE 70	20	26.0	25	31.0	30	36.0	24	30.0	19	25.0	148.0
25	DEN	Anders Myralf	Nomen nescio	D 80	9	15.0	29	35.0	DSQ	60.0	18	24.0	11	17.0	151.0
26	FRG	Karl Haist	Nomen nescio	G 238	DSQ	60.0	8	14.0	16	22.0	21	27.0	32	38.0	161.0
27	SUI	Alain Testuz	Nomen nescio	Z 258	21	27.0	19	25.0	27	33.0	19	25.0	DSQ	60.0	170.0
28	FRG	Curt Noel	Nomen nescio	G 229	27	33.0	34	40.0	23	29.0	42	48.0	25	31.0	181.0
29	NOR	Hans Wang	Nomen nescio	N 96	14	20.0	30	36.0	DSQ	60.0	30	36.0	24	30.0	182.0
30	FIN	Matti Jokinen	Nomen nescio	L 4	23	29.0	32	38.0	31	37.0	27	33.0	39	45.0	182.0
31	POL	Jan Bartosik	Nomen nescio	PZ 4	36	42.0	36	42.0	10	16.0	45	51.0	29	35.0	186.0
32	DEN	Valdemar Bandolowski	Nomen nescio	D 84	39	45.0	12	18.0	9	15.0	43	49.0	DSQ	60.0	187.0
33	SWE	Hans Gustavsson	Nomen nescio	S 83	41	47.0	22	28.0	29	35.0	44	50.0	23	29.0	189.0
34	SUI	Roger Guignard	Nomen nescio	Z 259	42	48.0	23	29.0	24	30.0	40	46.0	34	40.0	193.0
35	NOR	Terje Wang	Nomen nescio	N 90	13	19.0	42	48.0	35	41.0	20	26.0	DSQ	60.0	194.0
36	NOR	Kalle Nergaard	Nomen nescio	N 87	34	40.0	DSQ	60.0	DNF	60.0	8	14.0	15	21.0	195.0
37	GBR	Tony Clare	Nomen nescio	K 136	28	34.0	40	46.0	44	50.0	17	23.0	37	43.0	196.0
38	FRG	Andy Vinçon	Nomen nescio	G 240	33	39.0	41	47.0	34	40.0	31	37.0	30	36.0	199.0
39	DEN	Torsten Rasmussen	Nomen nescio	D 77	29	35.0	33	39.0	21	27.0	47	53.0	40	46.0	200.0
40	DEN	Lars Netterstrom	Nomen nescio	D 78	17	23.0	35	41.0	33	39.0	32	38.0	DSQ	60.0	201.0
41	NED	Willem van Walt Meijer	Nomen nescio	H 19	40	46.0	15	21.0	39	45.0	DNF	60.0	26	32.0	204.0
42	FRG	Roman Koch	Maxl Koch; Michael Beck	G 177	DSQ	60.0	39	45.0	37	43.0	35	41.0	16	22.0	211.0
43	FRG	Daniel Diesing	Nomen nescio	G 225	43	49.0	44	50.0	26	32.0	DNF	60.0	17	23.0	214.0
44	DEN	Per Buch	Nomen nescio	D 70	31	37.0	DSQ	60.0	DSQ	60.0	14	20.0	35	41.0	218.0
45	GBR	Martin Grävare	Nomen nescio	K 132	30	36.0	37	43.0	43	49.0	29	35.0	DSQ	60.0	223.0
46	FRG	Hans Heitmann	Nomen nescio	G 215	47	53.0	17	23.0	41	47.0	48	54.0	42	48.0	225.0
47	SUI	Ami Blanc	Nomen nescio	Z 234	44	50.0	43	49.0	DSQ	60.0	37	43.0	33	39.0	241.0
48	DEN	Stig Jensen	Nomen nescio	D 76	32	38.0	DSQ	60.0	36	42.0	39	45.0	DNF	60.0	245.0
49	FRA	Jean-Marie le Guillou	Nomen nescio	F 138	38	44.0	DSQ	60.0	28	34.0	49	55.0	DNF	60.0	253.0
50	GBR	C.C. Rae	Nomen nescio	K 126	45	51.0	46	52.0	DNF	60.0	41	47.0	38	44.0	254.0
51	DEN	Anders Linnet	Nomen nescio	D 73	DNF	60.0	47	53.0	40	46.0	46	52.0	41	47.0	258.0

Legend: DNF – Did not finish; DNS – Did not start; DSQ – Disqualified;
Discard is crossed out and does not count for the overall result.

- 1982 Progress

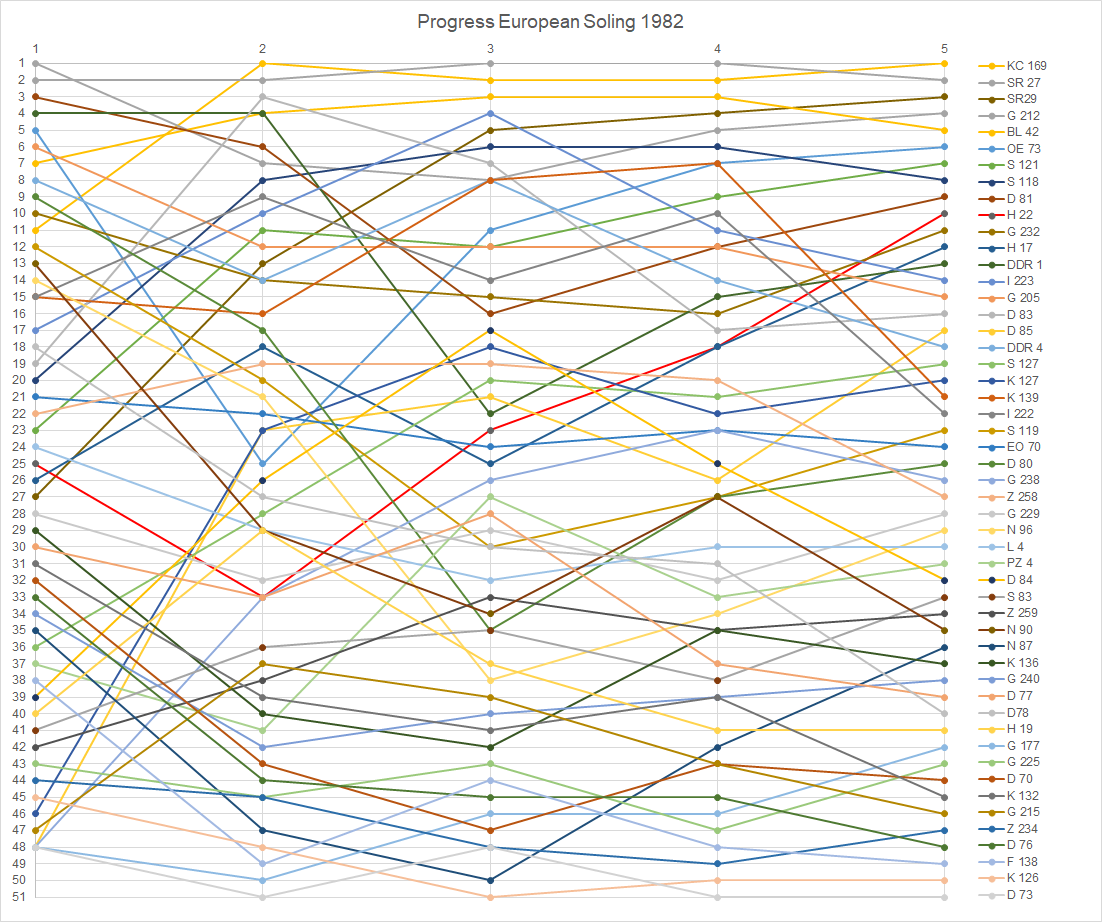

== 1983 Final results ==
1983
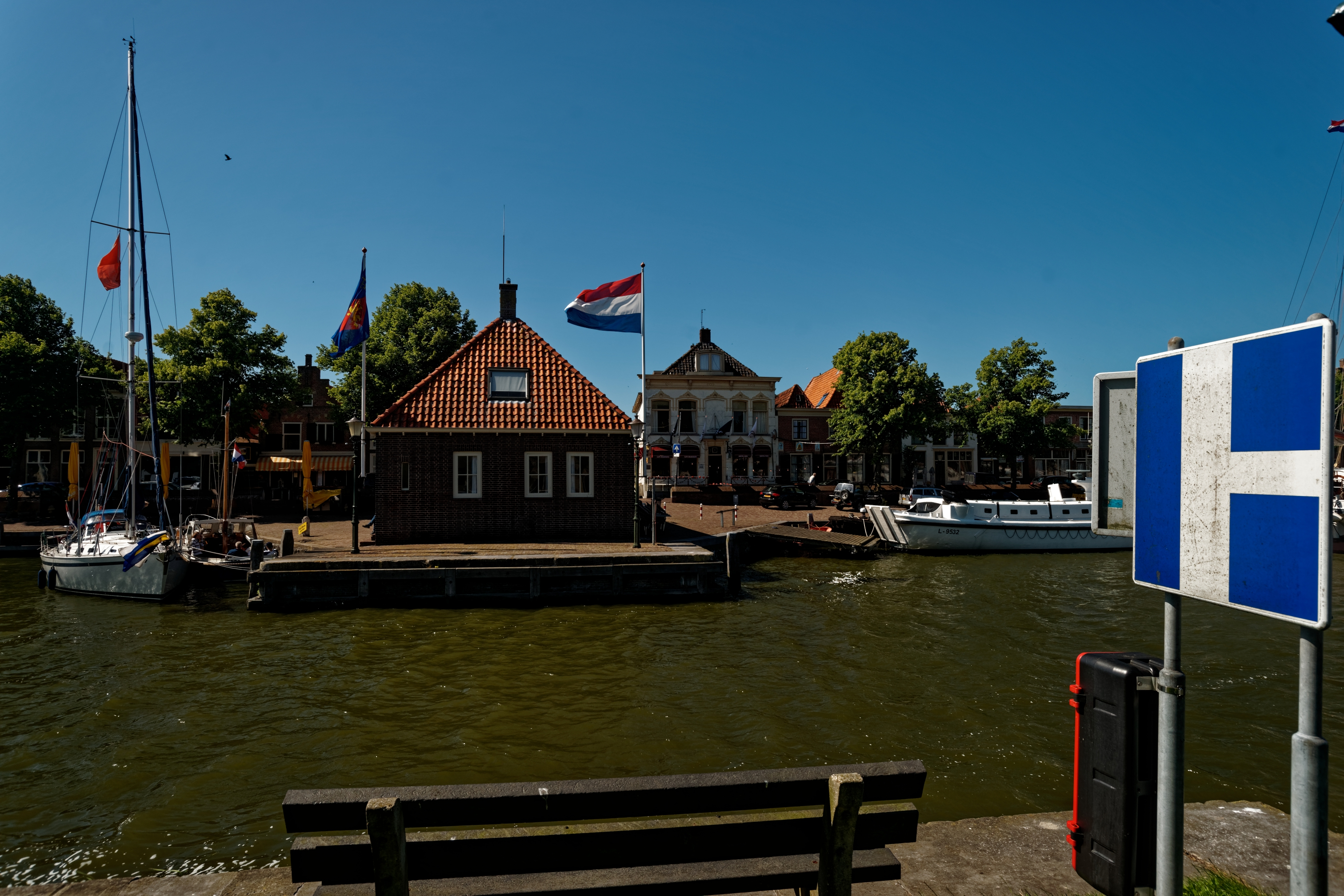

Event title
- Edition: 16
- Host: Royal Yacht Club Hollandia

Event details
- Venue: Medemblik, Netherlands
- Dates: 2–10 September
- Yachts: 50
- Key people: Netherlands Karel Beukema Toe Water Chairman of the Host Club and Race Officer
- Opened by: Karel Beukema Toe Water
- Opening ceremony: 4 September

Competitors
- Competitors: 150
- Competing nations: 17

Results
- (gold) Gold: Canada; Hans Fogh; John Kerr; Steve Calder
- (silver) Silver: Soviet Union; Boris Budnikov; Gennadi Strakh; Oleg Miron
- (bronze) Bronze: East Germany; Helmar Nauck; Norbert Hellriegel; Sven Diedering

This was the first major Soling event where all crew members were documented. In 1968 and beyond boat names and sail numbers were the top priority of the International Soling Association because that give a good insight of the growth of the class. The organization was more or less an organization of boat owners. This changed during the 80's into an organization for Soling Sailors.

Rank	Country	Helmsman	Crew	Sail No.	Race 1		Race 2		Race 3		Race 4		Race 5		Race 6		Race 7		Total	Total – discard
Rank	Country	Helmsman	Crew	Sail No.	Pos.	Pts.	Pos.	Pts.	Pos.	Pts.	Pos.	Pts.	Pos.	Pts.	Pos.	Pts.	Pos.	Pts.	Total	Total – discard
1st place, gold medalist(s)	CAN	Hans Fogh	Steve Calder; John Kerr	KC 169	9	15.0	1	0.0	1	0.0	1	0.0	2	3.0	~~14~~	~~20.0~~	1	0.0	38.0	18.0
2nd place, silver medalist(s)	URS	Boris Budnikov	Gennadi Strakh; Oleg Miron	SR 27	5	10.0	2	3.0	2	3.0	~~11~~	~~17.0~~	5	10.0	4	8.0	4	8.0	59.0	42.0
3rd place, bronze medalist(s)	GDR	Helmar Nauck	Sven Diedering; Herbert Hellriegel	DDR 4	1	0.0	5	10.0	7	13.0	8	14.0	~~13~~	~~19.0~~	3	5.7	6	11.7	73.4	54.4
4	GRE	Tassos Boudouris	Demitris Benauis; Dimitrios Deligiannis	GR 30	10	16.0	6	11.7	4	8.0	~~14~~	~~20.0~~	11	17.0	1	0.0	12	18.0	90.7	70.7
5	AUT	Michael Farthofer	Christian Holler; Richard Holler	OE 73	3	5.7	17	23.0	6	11.7	3	5.7	~~23~~	~~29.0~~	16	22.0	2	3.0	100.1	71.1
6	DEN	Valdemar Bandolowski	Niels Petersen; Theis Palm	D 84	7	13.0	4	8.0	3	5.7	10	16.0	~~27~~	~~33.0~~	6	11.7	16	22.0	109.4	76.4
7	GDR	Wolf Richter	Thomas Flach; Bernd Jäkel	DDR 1	2	3.0	12	18.0	13	19.0	2	3.0	15	21.0	~~20~~	~~26.0~~	10	16.0	106.0	80.0
8	DEN	Jesper Bank	Jan Mathiasen; Thomas Andersen	D 83	4	8.0	7	13.0	15	21.0	15	21.0	~~17~~	~~23.0~~	2	3.0	9	15.0	104.0	81.0
9	FRG	Willi Kuhweide	Eckart Loell; Otto Pohlmann	G 245	8	14.0	8	14.0	23	29.0	4	8.0	~~DSQ~~	~~57.0~~	5	10.0	7	13.0	145.0	88.0
10	GBR	Colin Simonds	Chris Simonds; Gavin Simonds	K 133	YMP	18.6	9	15.0	16	22.0	~~30~~	~~36.0~~	3	5.7	17	23.0	5	10.0	130.3	94.3
11	FRG	Erich Hirt, Jr.	Frank Neufing; Michael Obermaier	G 219	12	18.0	~~24~~	~~30.0~~	10	16.0	23	29.0	1	0.0	13	19.0	14	20.0	132.0	102.0
12	FRG	Thomas Jungblut	Klaus Stryi; Matthias Adamczewski	G 232	17	23.0	18	24.0	17	23.0	6	11.7	~~19~~	~~25.0~~	12	18.0	3	5.7	130.4	105.4
13	URS	Georgy Shayduko	Vladimir Gruzdev; Sergey Kanov	SR 29	13	19.0	14	20.0	19	25.0	13	19.0	~~DNF~~	~~57.0~~	7	13.0	11	17.0	170.0	113.0
14	NED	Peter Vollebrecht	Rolf Heemskerk; Rudy den Outer	H 22	18	24.0	19	25.0	5	10.0	~~25~~	~~31.0~~	14	20.0	10	16.0	15	21.0	147.0	116.0
15	DEN	William Friis-Moller	Hendrik Nielsen; Niles Nielssen	D 85	6	11.7	3	5.7	21	27.0	~~22~~	~~28.0~~	16	22.0	19	25.0	19	25.0	144.4	116.4
16	SWE	Jan Andersson	Crister Walleten; Bertil Larsson	S 133	26	32.0	11	17.0	9	15.0	9	15.0	21	27.0	9	15.0	~~27~~	~~33.0~~	154.0	121.0
17	NOR	Dag Usterud	Børre Skui; Stein Helvorsen	N 101	14	20.0	10	16.0	~~DNF~~	~~57.0~~	19	25.0	6	11.7	29	35.0	13	19.0	183.7	126.7
18	FRG	Roman Koch	Maxl Koch; Dieter Link	G 242	11	17.0	21	27.0	35	41.0	~~28~~	~~34.0~~	4	8.0	8	14.0	22	28.0	169.0	128.0
19	SWE	Magnus Grävare	Eric Wallin; Martin Gravare	S 128	21	27.0	15	21.0	20	26.0	5	10.0	~~28~~	~~34.0~~	15	21.0	18	24.0	163.0	129.0
20	SWE	Arwed von Gruenewaldt	Gunnar Krautz; D.D. Lundstrom	S 127	25	31.0	22	28.0	11	17.0	21	27.0	8	14.0	YMP	23.4	~~24~~	~~30.0~~	170.4	139.4
21	NOR	Terje Wang	Odd Godager; Frode Ranhoff	N 96	19	25.0	26	32.0	12	18.0	16	22.0	25	31.0	11	17.0	~~29~~	~~35.0~~	180.0	145.0
22	SWE	Erik Thorsell	Fredrik Winberg; Alex Wallenberg	S 122	~~35~~	~~41.0~~	16	22.0	8	14.0	7	13.0	34	40.0	33	39.0	17	23.0	192.0	151.0
23	FRG	Fritz Geis	Wolf Stadler; Michael Beck	G 244	27	33.0	~~40~~	~~46.0~~	14	20.0	17	23.0	31	37.0	21	27.0	8	14.0	200.0	154.0
24	HUN	György Fináczy	Tibor Izsak; Andras Toronyi	M 25	16	22.0	23	29.0	18	24.0	18	24.0	~~37~~	~~43.0~~	32	38.0	23	29.0	209.0	166.0
25	SWE	Valter Saaristu	Christer Junggren; Eje Öberg	S 121	15	21.0	27	33.0	28	34.0	20	26.0	20	26.0	~~37~~	~~43.0~~	31	37.0	220.0	177.0
26	FRA	Partick Haegeli	Philippe Richard; Yves Oliveau	F 142	22	28.0	25	31.0	~~29~~	~~35.0~~	27	33.0	24	30.0	22	28.0	25	31.0	216.0	181.0
27	GBR	Graham Bailey	Bill Masterman; Tim Symons	K 131	30	36.0	20	26.0	26	32.0	~~DNS~~	~~57.0~~	22	28.0	23	29.0	28	34.0	242.0	185.0
28	NED	Ben Staartjes	Kobus Vandenberg; Gijs Evers	H 17	29	35.0	30	36.0	22	28.0	26	32.0	33	39.0	18	24.0	~~34~~	~~40.0~~	234.0	194.0
29	FIN	Tom Jungell	Markus Mannstrom; Georg Tallberg	L 39	32	38.0	~~DNF~~	~~57.0~~	30	36.0	32	38.0	10	16.0	28	34.0	33	39.0	258.0	201.0
30	NOR	Kalle Nergaard	Hendrik Melson; Bjorn Bjordel	N 87	~~DNF~~	~~57.0~~	31	37.0	24	30.0	DNS	57.0	12	18.0	27	33.0	20	26.0	258.0	201.0
31	ITA	Gianluca Lamaro	Aurelio Dalla Vecchia; Massimo Dotoli	I 222	~~DNF~~	~~57.0~~	29	35.0	31	37.0	24	30.0	9	15.0	DNF	57.0	26	32.0	263.0	206.0
32	DEN	Per Buch	Ole Andersen; Hans Schultz	D 70	28	34.0	28	34.0	33	39.0	33	39.0	30	36.0	~~36~~	~~42.0~~	30	36.0	260.0	218.0
33	FRG	Achim Kadelbach	Peter Wallner; Christian Pochhamer	G 224	31	37.0	34	40.0	37	43.0	~~38~~	~~44.0~~	29	35.0	34	40.0	21	27.0	266.0	222.0
34	FRG	Karl Haist	Kai Michels; Pit Zipf	G 238	~~DNF~~	~~57.0~~	39	45.0	25	31.0	29	35.0	26	32.0	35	41.0	32	38.0	279.0	222.0
35	SWE	Hans Liljeblad	Tony Wallin; Anders Liljeblad	S 132	20	26.0	13	19.0	27	33.0	31	37.0	~~DNS~~	~~57.0~~	DNS	57.0	DNS	57.0	286.0	229.0
36	FRG	Curt Noel	Karsten Meyer; Axel May	G 229	33	39.0	33	39.0	38	44.0	36	42.0	7	13.0	~~PMS~~	~~57.0~~	DNF	57.0	291.0	234.0
37	SWE	Per Stoglund	Bengt Schaurek; Dick Sven	S 115	~~38~~	~~44.0~~	38	44.0	32	38.0	35	41.0	38	44.0	30	36.0	36	42.0	289.0	245.0
38	FIN	Heikki Hohtari	Thomas Baltscheffsky; Martin Baltscheffsky	L 41	41	47.0	37	43.0	41	47.0	~~44~~	~~50.0~~	18	24.0	39	45.0	39	45.0	301.0	251.0
39	SWE	Anders Rydin	Roger Mansson; Peter Lindstrom	S 124	34	40.0	~~DNF~~	~~57.0~~	36	42.0	DNS	57.0	35	41.0	25	31.0	35	41.0	309.0	252.0
40	SUI	Heiki Blok	Andreas Keller; Bruno Wild	Z 249	23	29.0	~~DNF~~	~~57.0~~	40	46.0	42	48.0	41	47.0	26	32.0	DNS	57.0	316.0	259.0
41	FRA	Jean-Marie le Guillou	Nicolas Fedorenko; Yves Steff	F 126	~~DNF~~	~~57.0~~	DNF	57.0	34	40.0	39	45.0	39	45.0	24	30.0	38	44.0	318.0	261.0
42	AUT	Uli Strohschneider	Hannes Blaschke; Andreas Blaschke	OE 78	37	43.0	32	38.0	39	45.0	34	40.0	32	38.0	~~DNF~~	~~57.0~~	DNF	57.0	318.0	261.0
43	ITA	Walter Marino	Corrado Cristaldini; Vigo Bardi	I 209	24	30.0	~~DNF~~	~~57.0~~	44	50.0	12	18.0	45	51.0	DNF	57.0	DNS	57.0	320.0	263.0
44	NED	Kurt Jansen	Pieter Horsmeier; Arjan Stoof	H 20	39	45.0	41	47.0	~~45~~	~~51.0~~	41	47.0	40	46.0	31	37.0	37	43.0	316.0	265.0
45	SWE	Jan Holmqvist	Stefan Hylander; Fredrik Lindahl	S 129	40	46.0	35	41.0	43	49.0	~~DNS~~	~~57.0~~	42	48.0	38	44.0	DNF	57.0	342.0	285.0
46	GBR	Tony Clare	Mart Vincett; Alex Tucker	K 136	43	49.0	~~DNF~~	~~57.0~~	46	52.0	43	49.0	36	42.0	DNF	57.0	40	46.0	352.0	295.0
47	FRG	Pieter Glaser	Wolfgang Fixson; Christian Gabriel	G 209	42	48.0	36	42.0	~~DNF~~	~~57.0~~	37	43.0	43	49.0	DNS	57.0	DNS	57.0	353.0	296.0
48	BEL	Sadi Claeys	Ignace Bosteels; Gerard van Drunen Netherlands	B 13	44	50.0	~~DNF~~	~~57.0~~	42	48.0	40	46.0	44	50.0	DNF	57.0	DNS	57.0	365.0	308.0
49	NED	Peter Frech	Peter van Buren; John van Seventer	H 21	36	42.0	~~DNF~~	~~57.0~~	DNS	57.0	DNF	57.0	46	52.0	DNS	57.0	DNS	57.0	379.0	322.0
50	FRG	Hans Heitmann	Martin Heitmann; Mathias Heitmann	G 215	~~DNF~~	~~57.0~~	DNF	57.0	DNS	57.0	DNS	57.0	DNS	57.0	DNS	57.0	DNS	57.0	399.0	342.0

Legend: DNF – Did not finish; DNS – Did not start; DSQ – Disqualified;
Discard is crossed out and does not count for the overall result.

- 1983 Progress

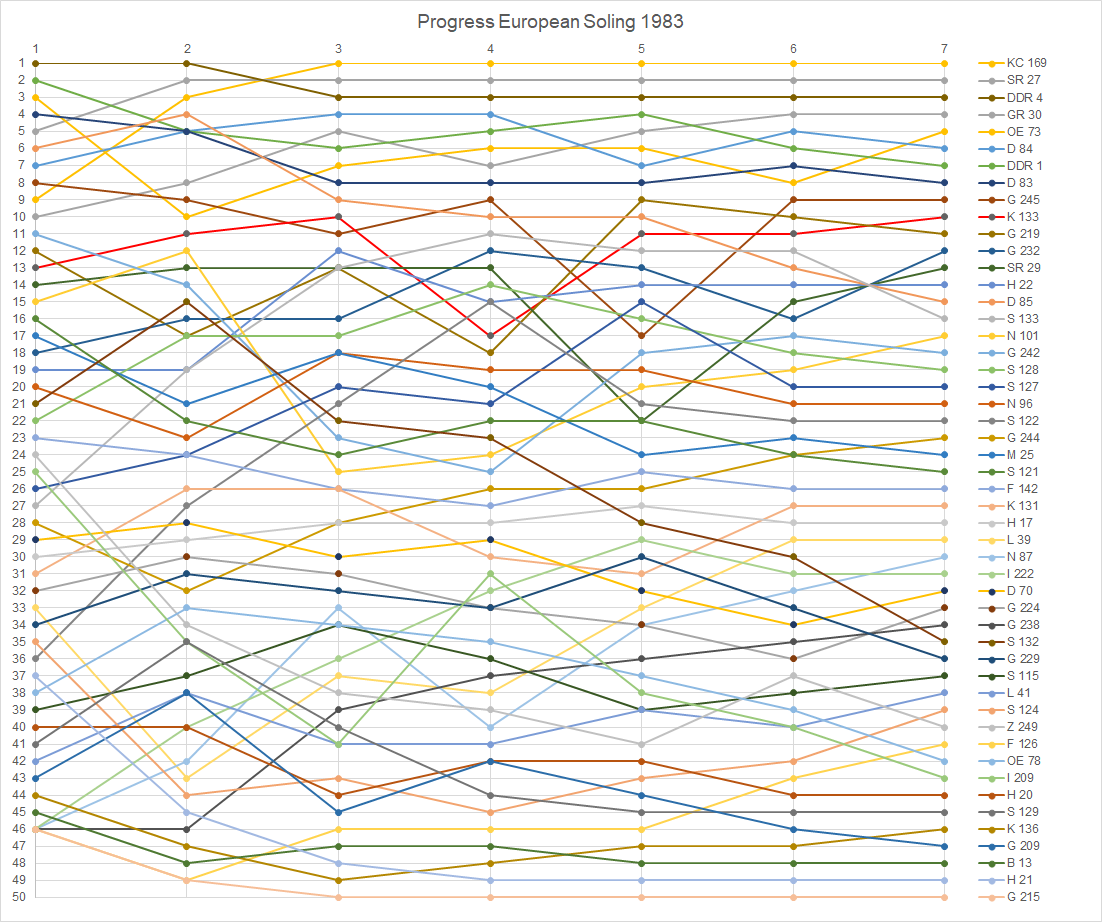

== 1984 Not held due to Olympic Games ==
1984

Event title
- Edition: 17

Event details
- Venue: Championship not held due to Olympic Games

== Further results ==
For further results see:

- Soling European Championship results (1968–1979)
- Soling European Championship results (1980–1984)
- Soling European Championship results (1985–1989)
- Soling European Championship results (1990–1994)
- Soling European Championship results (1995–1999)
- Soling European Championship results (2000–2004)
- Soling European Championship results (2005–2009)
- Soling European Championship results (2010–2014)
- Soling European Championship results (2015–2019)
- Soling European Championship results (2020–2024)
