= Sailing at the 1980 Summer Olympics – Soling =

Sailing at the Olympics

Soling at the Games of the XXII Olympiad
- Soling
- Venue: Tallinn
- Dates: 21 to 29 July
- Competitors: 27 from 9 nations
- Teams: 9

Medalists
1st place, gold medalist(s)		Poul Richard Høj Jensen; Valdemar Bandolowski; Erik Hansen	Denmark
2nd place, silver medalist(s)		Boris Budnikov; Aleksandr Budnikov; Nikolai Poliakov	Soviet Union
3rd place, bronze medalist(s)		Anastasios Bountouris; Anastasios Gavrilis; Aristidis Rapanakis	Greece

The Soling was a sailing event on the Sailing at the 1980 Summer Olympics program in Tallinn, USSR. Seven races were scheduled. 27 sailors, on 9 boats, from 9 nations competed.

== Results ==
Rank	Helmsman (Country)	Crew	Race I		Race II		Race III		Race IV		Race V		Race VI		Race VII		Total Points	Total -1
Rank	Helmsman (Country)	Crew	Rank	Points	Rank	Points	Rank	Points	Rank	Points	Rank	Points	Rank	Points	Rank	Points	Total Points	Total -1
1st place, gold medalist(s)	Poul Richard Høj Jensen (DEN)	Valdemar Bandolowski; Erik Hansen	1	0.0	5	10.0	~~6~~	~~11.7~~	5	10.0	2	3.0	1	0.0	1	0.0	34.7	23.0
2nd place, silver medalist(s)	Boris Budnikov (URS)	Aleksandr Budnikov; Nikolai Poliakov	3	5.7	~~8~~	~~14.0~~	3	5.7	2	3.0	5	10.0	2	3.0	2	3.0	44.4	30.4
3rd place, bronze medalist(s)	Tassos Boudouris (GRE)	Anastasios Gavrilis; Aristidis Rapanakis	~~9~~	~~15.0~~	3	5.7	1	0.0	6	11.7	1	0.0	4	8.0	3	5.7	46.1	31.1
4	Dieter Below (GDR)	Bernd Klenke; Michael Zachries	~~7~~	~~13.0~~	1	0.0	5	10.0	1	0.0	3	5.7	6	11.7	5	10.0	50.4	37.4
5	Geert Bakker (NED)	Steven Bakker; Dick Coster	2	3.0	2	3.0	~~7~~	~~13.0~~	4	8.0	4	8.0	5	10.0	7	13.0	58.0	45.0
6	Gastão Brun (BRA)	Vicente Brun; Roberto Souza	4	8.0	~~7~~	~~13.0~~	2	3.0	3	5.7	7	13.0	3	5.7	6	11.7	60.1	47.1
7	Jean-François Corminboeuf (SUI)	Roger-Claude Guignard; Robert Perret	5	10.0	4	8.0	8	14.0	9	15.0	6	11.7	7	13.0	~~9~~	~~15.0~~	86.7	71.7
8	Jan Andersson (SWE)	Göran Andersson; Bertil Larsson	6	11.7	~~9~~	~~15.0~~	9	15.0	7	13.0	8	14.0	8	14.0	4	8.0	90.7	75.7
9	Jan Bartosik (POL)	Jerzy Wujecki; Zdzislaw Kotla	8	14.0	6	11.7	4	8.0	8	14.0	~~9~~	~~15.0~~	9	15.0	8	14.0	91.7	76.7

DNF = Did Not Finish, DNS= Did Not Start, DSQ = Disqualified, PMS = Premature Start, YMP = Yacht Materially Prejudiced
= Male, = Female

=== Daily standings ===
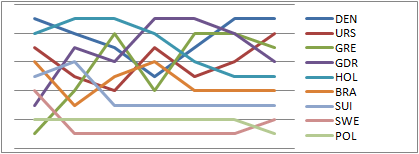
Graph showing the daily standings in the Soling during the 1980 Summer Olympics
