= Greece at the 1980 Summer Olympics =

- IOC code: GRE
- NOC: Committee of the Olympic Games

in Moscow Soviet Union
- Competitors: 43 (40 men/3 women)
- Flag bearer: Ilias Khatzipavlis
- Medals Ranked 22nd: Gold 1 Silver 0 Bronze 2 Total 3

Summer Olympics appearances (overview)
- 1896; 1900; 1904; 1908; 1912; 1920; 1924; 1928; 1932; 1936; 1948; 1952; 1956; 1960; 1964; 1968; 1972; 1976; 1980; 1984; 1988; 1992; 1996; 2000; 2004; 2008; 2012; 2016; 2020; 2024

Other related appearances
- 1906 Intercalated Games

Greece competed at the 1980 Summer Olympics in Moscow, USSR. Greek athletes have competed in every Summer Olympic Games. Of the five nations that have been to every Summer Games (the others being Australia, Britain, France and Switzerland), Greece was the only one to compete under its national flag at Moscow, as the other five and several other nations competed under the Olympic flag (New Zealand flew the flag of the New Zealand Olympic and Commonwealth Games Association) in protest of the USSR's involvement in the Afghan Civil War.

== Medalists ==
=== Gold ===
- Stelios Mygiakis – Wrestling, Men's Greco-Roman Featherweight

=== Bronze ===
- Georgios Khatziioannidis – Wrestling, Men's freestyle Featherweight
- Tasos Boudouris, Tasos Gavrilis and Aristidis Rapanakis – Sailing, Men's Soling Team Competition

== Results by event ==
=== Athletics ===
Men's 100 metres

- Lambros Kefalas

- Heat – 10.70
- Quarterfinals – 10.62 (→ did not advance)

Men's 200 metres

- Nikolaos Angelopoulos

- Heat – 21.98 (→ did not advance)

Men's Marathon

- Michael Koussis

- Final – 2:18:02 (→ 20th place)

Men's 20 km Walk

- Aristidis Karageorgos

- Final – 1:36:53.4 (→ 15th place)

Men's 50 km Walk

- Aristidis Karageorgos

- Final – 4:24:36 (→ 12th place)

Men's Long Jump

- Dimitrios Delifotis

- Qualification – 7.74 m (→ did not advance)

Women's Long Jump

- Maroula Lambrou

- Qualifying Round – 6.37 m (→ did not advance, 15th place)

Women's Javelin Throw

- Sofia Sakorafa

- Qualification – no mark (→ did not advance)

=== Water polo ===
==== Men's team competition ====
- Preliminary Round (Group A)

- Lost to Netherlands (7–8)
- Lost to Romania (4–6)
- Lost to Hungary (5–8)

- Final Round (Group B)

- Defeated Sweden (9–5)
- Defeated Bulgaria (6–4)
- Lost to Australia (2–4)
- Lost to Italy (3–4)
- Lost to Romania (8–11) → 10th place

- Team Roster

- Ioannis Vossos
- Thomas Karalogos
- Sotirios Stathakis
- Spyros Kapralos
- Kiriakos Giannopoulos
- Aris Kefalogiannis
- Ioannis Garifallos
- Andreas Gounas
- Antonios Aronis
- Markellos Sitarenios
- Ioannis Giannouris

=== Weightlifting ===
Heavyweight (100–110 kg)

- Dimitrios Zarzavatsidis

Bantamweight (–56 kg)

- Ioannis-Sidiropoulos

Flyweight (–52 kg)

- Ioannis Katsaidonis

Middle Heavyweight (82.5–90 kg)

- Nikos Iliadis

Lightweight (60–67.5 kg)

- Pavlos Lespouridis

=== Wrestling ===
Greco-Roman Light-Heavyweight (82–90 kg)

- Georgios Pozidis

Greco-Roman Heavyweight (90–100 kg)

- Georgios Pozidis

Greco-Roman Flyweight (48–52 kg)

- Charalambos Cholidis

Freestyle Featherweight (57–62 kg)

- Georgios Khatziioannidis – Bronze Medal

Greco-Roman Featherweight (57–62 kg)

- Stelios Mygiakis – Gold Medal

=== Sailing ===
Triplehanded Keelboat

- Aristidis Rapanakis – Bronze Medal
- Anastasios Gavrilis – Bronze Medal
- Tasos Bountouris – Bronze Medal

Singlehanded Dinghy (Finn Class)

- Ilias Khatzipavlis

=== Shooting ===
Mixed Skeet

- Petros Pappas
- Rodolfos Georgios-Alexakos

Mixed 50m Rifle, Prone

- Athanasios Papageorgiou

=== Rowing ===
Coxless Pairs

- Georgios Kourkoumbas
- Nikolaos Ioannidis

Single Sculls

- Kostas Kontomanolis
