= Skui =

Skui may refer to:

- Børre Skui (born 1958), Norwegian sailor
- El Caraño Airport, Colombia (ICAO code SKUI)
- Skui, Norway
