= Bertil Larsson =

Bertil Larsson may refer to:

- Bertil Larsson (footballer), Swedish footballer
- Bertil Larsson (sailor) (born 1954), Swedish sailor
