= Bartosik =

Bartosik is a Polish surname. Notable people with the surname include:

- Alison Bartosik (born 1983), American competitor in synchronized swimming
- Martina Šimkovičová (née Bartošíková; born 1971), Slovak TV presenter and politician
- Jan Bartosik (1948–1995), Polish sailor
- Józef Bartosik (1917–2008), Polish Naval officer
- Olimpia Bartosik-Wiśniewska (born 1976), Polish chess master
- Tadeusz Bartosik (1925–1985), Polish actor
