= Kalle Coster =

Dutch sailor (born 1982)

Personal information
- Full name: Kalle Kristian Coster
- Nationality: Dutch
- Born: 9 December 1982 (age 43) Leiden, Netherlands
- Height: 1.88 m (6 ft 2 in)

Sailing career
- Sport: Sailing
- Club: Watersportvereniging Braassemermeer
- Class: Men's 470
Medal record
Representing Netherlands
470 World Championships
Silver medal – second place	2007 Cascais	Men's 470
470 European Championships
Silver medal – second place	2008 Riva del Garda	Men's 470
Bronze medal – third place	2005 Gdynia	Men's 470
- Updated on 14 January 2014

Kalle Kristian Coster (born 9 December 1982 in Leiden) is a sailor from the Netherlands. Coster represented his country for the first time at the 2004 Summer Olympics in Athens. With his brother Sven Coster as helmsman, Coster took 6th place as crew in the Dutch Men's 470. Coster's second Olympic appearance was during the 2008 Olympics in Qingdao again as crew in the Men's 470 with his brother as helmsman. Coster took the 4th place. Again with Sven as helmsman in the Men's 470 Coster crewed the Dutch 470 at the 2012 Olympics in Weymouth. The brothers finished in 12th place.

Kalle Coster is the son of Dick Coster.

== Professional life ==
- CEO at "Sailmon" (2014–Present) '
- Owner of Coster Yachting (2006 – 2014)
