= Jean-François Corminboeuf =

Swiss sailor

Personal information
- Born: 4 February 1953 (age 72) Switzerland
- Height: 1.84 m (6.0 ft)

Sport

Sailing career
- Class: Soling
- Updated on 27 February 2020

Jean-François Corminboeuf (French pronunciation: [ʒɑ̃ fʁɑ̃swa kɔʁmɛ̃bœf]; born 4 February 1953) is a sailor from Switzerland, who represented his country at the 1980 Summer Olympics in Tallinn as helmsman in the Soling. With crew members Robert Perret and Roger-Claude Guignard they took the 7th place.
