= Roger-Claude Guignard =

Swiss sailor (1935–2022)

Personal information
- Born: 5 February 1935 Switzerland
- Died: 28 August 2022 (aged 87)
- Height: 1.76 m (5.8 ft)

Sport

Sailing career
- Class: Soling
- Updated on 29 August 2022

Roger-Claude Guignard (5 February 1935 – 28 August 2022) was a sailor from Switzerland, who represented his country at the 1980 Summer Olympics in Tallinn as crew member in the Soling. With helmsman Jean-François Corminboeuf and fellow crew member Robert Perret they took the 7th place.
