= Robert Perret =

Suisse sailor

Personal information
- Born: 4 May 1946 (age 79) Switzerland
- Height: 1.86 m (6.1 ft)

Sport

Sailing career
- Class: Soling
- Updated on 27 February 2020

Robert Perret (born 4 May 1946) is a sailor from Switzerland, who represented his country at the 1980 Summer Olympics in Tallinn as crew member in the Soling. With helmsman Jean-François Corminboeuf and fellow crew member Roger-Claude Guignard they took the 7th place.
