= Oleg Miron =

Olympic sailor from the Soviet Union

Personal information
- Native name: Олег Геннадьевич Мирон
- Full name: Oleg Gennadyevich Miron
- Nationality: Soviet Union
- Born: 21 January 1956 (age 70) Hrodna
- Height: 1.83 m (6.0 ft)

Sailing career
- Sport: Sailing
- Class: Soling
- Updated on 28 February 2020

Oleg Miron (born: 21 January 1956) is a sailor from Hrodna, USSR who represented his country at the 1988 Summer Olympics in Busan, South Korea as a crew member in the Soling. With helmsman Georgy Shayduko and fellow crew member Nikolay Polyakov they finished in 10th place.
