= Sven Coster =

Dutch sailor (born 1978)

Personal information
- Full name: Sven Erik Coster
- Nationality: Dutch
- Born: 2 December 1978 (age 47) Leiden, Netherlands
- Height: 1.83 m (6 ft 0 in)

Sailing career
- Sport: Sailing
- Club: Watersportvereniging Braassemermeer
- Classes: Soling, Men's 470
Medal record
Representing Netherlands
Vintage Yachting Games
Silver medal – second place	2008 Medemblik	Soling
470 World Championships
Silver medal – second place	2007 Cascais	Men's 470
470 European Championships
Silver medal – second place	2008 Riva del Garda	Men's 470
Bronze medal – third place	2005 Gdynia	Men's 470
- Updated on 13 February 2014

Sven Erik Coster (born 2 December 1978, in Leiden) is a sailor from the Netherlands. Coster represented his country for the first time at the 2004 Summer Olympics in Athens. With his brother Kalle Coster as crew Coster took 6th place as helmsman in the Dutch Men's 470. Coster's second Olympic appearance was during the 2008 Olympics in Qingdao again as helmsman in the 470 and his brother as crew, Coster took the 4th place. Also with Kalle as crew in the 470 Coster helmed the Dutch 470 at the 2012 Olympics in Weymouth. The brothers finished on the 12th place.

Sven Coster also represented The Netherlands during the 2008 Vintage Yachting Games in Medemblik as crew in the Soling with helmsman Steven Bakker and fellow crewmembers Dick Coster and Joost Houweling. The team took silver.

Sven Coster is the son of Dick Coster.

== Professional life ==
Coster is International Sales Manager at Hall Spars.
