= Göran Andersson (sailor, born 1956) =

Sweden sailor

Personal information
- Full name: Bengt Göran Andersson
- Born: 14 February 1956 (age 70) Älvdalen, Sweden
- Height: 1.98 m (6.5 ft)

Sport

Sailing career
- Class: Soling
- Club: Trälhavets Båtklubb

Göran Andersson (born 14 February 1956) is a Swedish sailor who represented his country at the 1980 Summer Olympics in Tallinn, as crew member in the Soling.

Andersson joined the Soling team of Jan Andersson and Bertil Larsson in the autumn of 1979 and by beating the team of Jörgen Sundelin in the Swedish trials during that ended with the 1980 Soling European Championship in Helsinki, they were chosen to represent Sweden at the 1980 Summer Olympics. With helmsman Jan Andersson and fellow crew member Larsson, they took the eighth place.

Andersson represented Trälhavets Båtklubb.
