= Dick Coster =

Dutch sailor (born 1946)

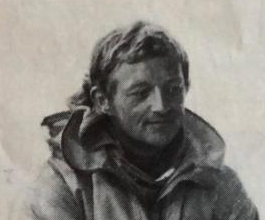
- Coster in 1976

Personal information
- Full name: Benedictus Antonius Maria Coster
- Nationality: Dutch
- Born: 19 June 1946 (age 80) Leiden
- Height: 1.72 m (5.6 ft)

Sailing career
- Sport: Sailing
- Club: Koninklijke Watersport Vereniging; De Kaag
- Class: Soling
Medal record
Sailing
Representing Netherlands
Vintage Yachting Games
Silver medal – second place	2008 Medemblik	Soling
- Updated on 2014-01-30

Benedictus Antonius Maria "Dick" Coster (born 19 June 1946 in Leiden) is a sailor from the Netherlands. Since the Netherlands did boycott the Moscow Olympic Games Coster represented his National Olympic Committee at the 1980 Summer Olympics in Tallinn, USSR under the Dutch NOC flag. With Geert Bakker as helmsman and fellow crew member Steven Bakker, Coster took the 5th place in the Soling. During the 1976 Olympics Coster was substitute for the Dutch Soling team.

Dick Coster also represented The Netherlands during the 2008 Vintage Yachting Games in Medemblik as crew in the Soling with helmsman Steven Bakker and fellow crewmembers Sven Coster and Joost Houweling. The team took silver.

== Sailing career ==
Coster sailed Solo before he picked up Olympic sailing. During the Olympic campaigns (2002–2012) of his sons (Sven Coster and Kalle Coster) Coster worked as their coach.

== Professional life ==
Until his retirement Coster worked in the assurance business.

== Controversy ==
Several countries did boycott the 1980 Summer Olympics, others like France did not go since they found the competition devaluated. As result only half of the expected fleet was present during the Olympic regattas.

== Sources ==
- Evans, Hilary; Gjerde, Arild; Heijmans, Jeroen; Mallon, Bill; et al. "Dick Coster". Olympics at Sports-Reference.com. Sports Reference LLC. Archived from the original on 17 April 2020.
- "Nederlandse delegatie" (in Dutch). Leeuwarder courant : hoofdblad van Friesland. 12 July 1976.
- "Olympische zeilselectie" (in Dutch). De Telegraaf. 20 May 1976.
- "Montréal 1976 Official Report, Volume I: Organization" (PDF). Ottawa: COJO. 1978. Archived from the original (PDF) on 2 February 2014.
- "Montréal 1976 Official Report, Volume II: Facilities" (PDF). Ottawa: COJO. 1978. Archived from the original (PDF) on 2 February 2014.
- "Montréal 1976 Official Report, Volume III: Results" (PDF). Ottawa: COJO. 1978. Archived from the original (PDF) on 1 January 2014.
- "Zeilers:, We gaan'" (in Dutch). De Telegraaf. 16 May 1980.
- "Zeilploeg bleef buiten de medailles" (in Dutch). De Telegraaf. 30 July 1980.
- "Staartjes: "Het heeft niet meegezeten" Geen medailles voor Nederlandse zeilers" (in Dutch). De waarheid. 31 July 1980.
- "Franse zeilploeg blijft thuis" (in Dutch). Amigoe. 22 May 1980.
- "Games of the XXII Olympiad, Volume I: Moscow, Tallinn, Leningrad, Kiev and Minsk" (PDF). Fizkultura i Sport Publishers. 1981. Archived from the original (PDF) on 17 October 2013.
- "Games of the XXII Olympiad, Volume II: Organisation" (PDF). Fizkultura i Sport Publishers. 1981. Archived from the original (PDF) on 17 October 2013.
- "Games of the XXII Olympiad, Volume III: Participants and Results" (PDF). Fizkultura i Sport Publishers. 1981. Archived from the original (PDF) on 17 October 2013.
