= Stein Lund Halvorsen =

Norwegian sailor (born 1959)

Personal information
- Nationality: Norwegian
- Born: 16 March 1959 (age 66) Porsgrunn, Norway

Sport
- Sport: Sailing

Stein Lund Halvorsen (born 16 March 1959) is a Norwegian sailor. He was born in Porsgrunn. He participated at the 1984 Summer Olympics in Los Angeles, where he placed fifth in the Soling class, together with Dag Usterud and Børre Skui.
