= Jean-Marie le Guillou =

French sailor

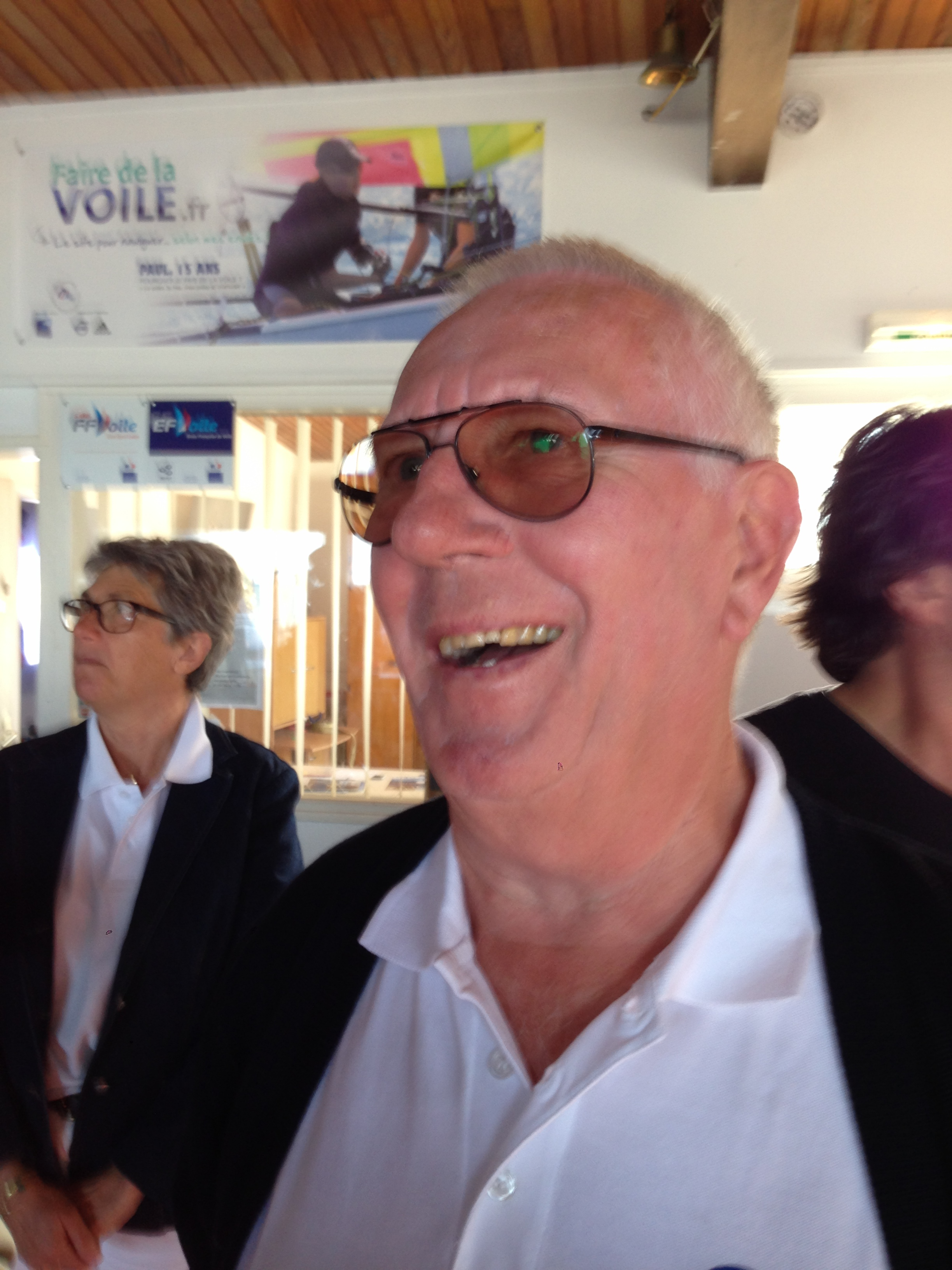
- Jean-Marie le Guillou during the 2014 European Soling Championship at Quiberon, France

Personal information
- Full name: Jean-Marie le Guillou
- Nationality: French
- Born: January 24, 1941 (age 85)

Sailing career
- Sport: Sailing
- Class: Soling
Medal record
World Championships
Gold medal – first place	1969 Sandhamn	5.5m
- Updated on 2014-06-22

Jean-Marie le Guillou (born 24 January 1941) is a French sailor who competed in the 1972 Summer Olympics.
