= Anastasios Bountouris =

Greek sailor (born 1955)

Anastasios “Tasos” Bountouris
Personal information
- Native name: Αναστάσιος Μπουντούρης
- Nationality: Greek
- Born: August 2, 1955 (age 71) Piraeus, Greece
- Height: 186 cm (6 ft 1 in)
- Weight: 103 kg (227 lb)

Sport
- Sport: Sailing
- Events: Soling, Finn, Star
Medal record
Sailing
Representing Greece
Olympic Games
Bronze medal – third place	1980 Moscow	Soling class

Anastasios "Tasos" Bountouris (born 2 August 1955 in Piraeus, Greece) is a Greek sailor who competed at six Olympics between 1976 and 1996. He is the first Greek to compete at six Olympic Games, an achievement so far matched by shooter Agathi Kassoumi and archer Evangelia Psarra.

He won a bronze medal in the 1980 Olympics in the Soling with Anastasios Gavrilis and Aristidis Rapanakis.

His brother Antonios is also a sailor; they were part of the same Soling team at the 1988 Olympics.

== See also ==
- List of athletes with the most appearances at Olympic Games
