= Trälhavets Båtklubb =

Swedish yacht club

- Burgee
- Short name: TÄBK
- Location: Österåker, Stockholm, Sweden
- Website: www.tralhavetsbk.se

Trälhavets Båtklubb (TBK) is one of the larger yacht clubs in Sweden. As of 2024, the club counts 1800 members. It is situated in Österåker, just outside Stockholm, right in the middle the Trälhavet.

Trälhavets Båtklubb runs sailing schools for young sailors, arranging dinghy races and has large facilities for more than 600 yachts.

Trälhavets Båtklubb also has premises on the island of Örsholmen west of Karklö in Stockholm archipelago, and on Ingmarsö and Kålö.
