= Ioannis Katsaidonis =

Greek weightlifter (born 1957)

Personal information
- Nationality: Greek
- Born: 4 March 1957 (age 68)

Sport
- Sport: Weightlifting

Ioannis Katsaidonis (born 4 March 1957) is a Greek weightlifter. He competed at the 1980 Summer Olympics and the 1984 Summer Olympics.
