= Steven Bakker =

Dutch sailor (born 1949)

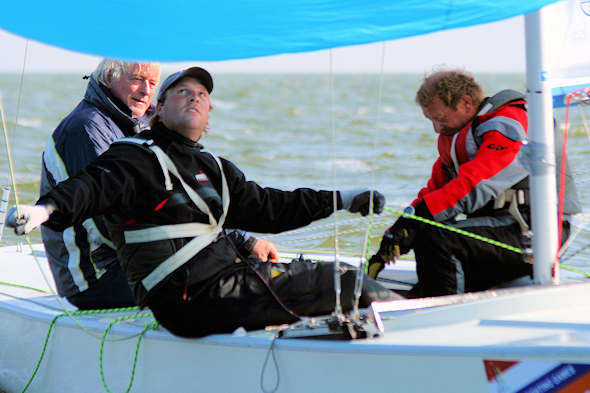
- Bakker at the helm of the Soling during the 2008 Vintage Yachting Games. (with Dick Coster and Joost Houweling).

Personal information
- Full name: Steven Feico Alle Bakker
- Nationality: Dutch
- Born: 13 April 1949 (age 77) Rotterdam, Netherlands
- Height: 2.00 m (6.56 ft)

Sailing career
- Sport: Sailing
- Club: Koninklijke Watersport Vereniging; De Kaag
- Classes: Star; Soling
- Updated on 2014-01-30

Steven Feico Alle Bakker (born 13 April 1949 in Rotterdam) is a sailor from the Netherlands. Since the Netherlands did boycott the Moscow Olympic Games Bakker represented his National Olympic Committee at the 1980 Summer Olympics, which was boycotted by several countries, in Tallinn, USSR under the Dutch NOC flag. With his father Geert Bakker as helmsman and fellow crew member Dick Coster, Bakker took the 5th place in the Soling. In the 1988 Olympics in Pusan Bakker made his second Olympic appearance. This time as helmsman in the Dutch Star with Kobus Vandenberg as crew. They took 9th place.

Steven Bakker also represented The Netherlands during the 2008 Vintage Yachting Games in Medemblik as helmsman in the Soling with crewmembers Sven/ Dick Coster and Joost Houweling. The team took silver. At the 2012 Vintage Yachting Games at Lake Como Bakker helmed again the Soling now with crewmembers Robin Segaar and Casper van Drunen. The team finished 11th in the series.

== Professional life ==
Bakker held several positions in the construction and real estate business. Nowadays he is director of Varese in the Netherlands.

== Sources ==
- "Steven Bakker Bio, Stats, and Results". Olympic Sports. Sports-Reference.com. Archived from the original on 18 April 2020.
- "Zeilers: 'We gaan'". De Telegraaf (in Dutch). 16 May 1980.
- "Zeilploeg bleef buiten de medailles". Leeuwarder Courant : Hoofdblad van Friesland (in Dutch). De Telegraaf. 30 July 1980.
- "Staartjes: "Het heeft niet meegezeten" Geen medailles voor Nederlandse zeilers". De waarheid (in Dutch). 31 July 1980.
- "Franse zeilploeg blijft thuis". Amigoe (in Dutch). 22 May 1980.
- "Games of the XXII Olympiad, Volume I: Moscow, Tallinn, Leningrad, Kiev and Minsk" (PDF). Fizkultura i Sport Publishers. 1981. Archived from the original (PDF) on 17 October 2013.
- "Games of the XXII Olympiad, Volume II: Organisation" (PDF). Fizkultura i Sport Publishers. 1981. Archived from the original (PDF) on 17 October 2013.
- "Games of the XXII Olympiad, Volume III: Participants and Results" (PDF). Fizkultura i Sport Publishers. 1981. Archived from the original (PDF) on 17 October 2013.
- "De Nederlandse olympische zeilploeg". De Telegraaf (in Dutch). 10 September 1988.
- "Nederlandse zeilploeg met lege handen naar huis". De Telegraaf (in Dutch). 28 September 1988.
- Official Report, Volume 1: Organization and Planning (PDF). Seoul: Olympic Organizing Committee. 1989. Archived from the original (PDF) on 4 March 2016.
- Official Report, Volume 2: Competition, Summary and Results (PDF). Seoul: Seoul Olympic Organizing Committee. 1989. Archived from the original (PDF) on 7 October 2013.
- "De Nederlandse olympische zeilploeg". De Telegraaf (in Dutch). 10 September 1988.
- "Nederlandse zeilploeg met lege handen naar huis". De Telegraaf (in Dutch). 28 September 1988.
- Official Report, Volume 1: Organization and Planning (PDF). Seoul: Olympic Organizing Committee. 1989. Archived from the original (PDF) on 4 March 2016.
- Official Report, Volume 2: Competition, Summary and Results (PDF). Seoul: Seoul Olympic Organizing Committee. 1989. Archived from the original (PDF) on 7 October 2013.
- "Steven Bakker". www.linkedin.com.
- "Varese". www.varese.nl.
