= Bernd Klenke =

East-German sailor

Personal information
- Nationality: East-Germany
- Born: 19 September 1946 (age 79) Berlin, East Germany
- Height: 1.84 m (6.0 ft)

Sport

Sailing career
- Class: Soling
- Club: FSE Berlin
- Updated on 27 February 2020

Bernd Klenke (born 19 September 1946 in Berlin) is a sailor from East Germany, who represented his country at the 1980 Summer Olympics in Tallinn as a crew member in the Soling. Along with helmsman Dieter Below and fellow crew member Michael Zachries, they finished in 4th place.
