= Aristidis Karageorgos =

Greek racewalker

Personal information
- Nationality: Greek
- Born: 27 July 1951 (age 74)

Sport
- Sport: Athletics
- Event: Racewalking

Aristidis Karageorgos (born 27 July 1951) is a Greek racewalker. He competed in the men's 20 kilometres walk at the 1980 Summer Olympics.
