= Jerzy Wujecki =

Olympic Sailor from Poland

Personal information
- Nationality: Poland
- Born: 20 October 1956 (age 69) Szczecin
- Height: 1.87 m (6.1 ft)

Sport

Sailing career
- Class: Soling
- Club: Szczecin
- Updated on 27 February 2020

Jerzy Wujecki (born 20 October 1956) is a sailor from Szczecin, Poland, who competed in the 1980 Summer Olympics in Tallinn as a crew member in the Soling event. With helmsman Jan Bartosik and fellow crew member Zdzislaw Kotla they took the 9th place.
