= Boris Budnikov =

Soviet sailor (1942–2023)

Medal record

Sailing

Representing Soviet Union

Olympic Games
Silver medal – second place	1980 Moscow	Soling class

Boris Fyodorovich Budnikov (Russian: Борис Фёдорович Будников, 16 February 1942 – 26 April 2023) was a Soviet sailor. He won the silver medal in Soling in the 1980 Summer Olympics in Moscow along with Alexandr Budnikov and Nikolay Poliakov. Budnikov died on 26 April 2023, at the age of 81.
