= Dag Usterud =

Norwegian sailor

Personal information
- Nationality: Norwegian
- Born: 3 December 1961 (age 63); Porsgrunn, Norway

Sport
- Sport: Sailing

Dag Halfdan Usterud (born 3 December 1961) is a Norwegian sailor. He was born in Porsgrunn. He participated at the 1984 Summer Olympics in Los Angeles, where he placed fifth in the Soling class, together with Børre Skui and Stein Lund Halvorsen.
