= Aristidis Kefalogiannis =

Greek water polo player

Personal information
- Born: March 14, 1960 (age 65)

Sport
- Sport: Water polo

Aristidis Kefalogiannis (born 14 March 1960) is a Greek former water polo player who competed in the 1980 Summer Olympics, in the 1984 Summer Olympics, and in the 1988 Summer Olympics.
