= Børre Skui =

Norwegian sailor

Personal information
- Nationality: Norwegian
- Born: 6 July 1958 (age 66); Porsgrunn, Norway

Sport
- Sport: Sailing

Børre Skui (born 6 July 1958) is a former Norwegian sailor. He was born in Porsgrunn. He participated at the 1984 Summer Olympics in Los Angeles, where he placed fifth in the Soling class, together with Dag Usterud and Stein Lund Halvorsen.
