= Aristidis Rapanakis =

Greek sailor (1954–2022)

Medal record

Sailing

Representing Greece

Olympic Games
Bronze medal – third place	1980 Moscow	Soling class

Aristidis Rapanakis (Greek: Αριστίδης Ραπανάκης; 11 February 1954 – 22 October 2022) was a Greek competitive sailor and Olympic medalist. He won a bronze medal in the Soling class at the 1980 Summer Olympics in Moscow. His death was announced on 23 October 2022.
