= Jan Bartosik =

Polish sailor

Personal information
- Nationality: Polish
- Born: 8 July 1948 Szczecin
- Died: 24 October 1995 (aged 47) Innsbruck, Austria
- Height: 1.82 m (6.0 ft)

Sport

Sailing career
- Class: Soling
- Club: Szczecin
- Updated on 27 February 2020

Jan Bartosik (born 8 July 1948 in Szczecin, died 24 October 1995 in Innsbruck) was a sailor from Poland, who competed in the 1980 Summer Olympics in Tallinn as helmsman in the Soling event. Along with crew members Jerzy Wujecki and Zdzislaw Kotla, they took 9th place.
