= Zdzisław Kotla =

Polish sailor

Zdzisław Kotla (5 May 1949– 18 October 2012) was a Polish Olympic sailor. He was the brother of Ryszard Kotla.

== Biography ==
He was a member of the Yachting Club Pogoń in Szczecin. From 1976 he sailed in the Soling class. He competed in the 1980 Summer Olympics in Moscow (Tallinn) in a team with Jan Bartosik and Jerzy Wujecki.

=== Achievements ===
- HUN 1st place in the International Hungarian Championship in 1979
- DEN 5th place in the International Danish Championship in 1980
- 9th place in the 1980 Summer Olympics: Soling Class – with a result of 91.70 (the winner Denmark had a result of 34.70). The placement of the Polish team in the consecutive races: 8–6–4–8–9–9–8.

== Bibliography ==
- Anna Pawlak, Olimpijczycy: polscy sportowcy w latach 1924-1998 ("The Olympic Athletes: the Polish sportsmen between 1924-1998"), p. 128
- Zbigniew Porada, Starożytne i nowożytne igrzyska olimpijskie ("The Ancient and Modern Olympic Games"), p. 1009
- Zygmunt Głuszek, Polscy olimpijczycy 1924-1984 ("The Polish Olympic Athletes 1924-1984"), Warsaw 1988
