= Jan Andersson (sailor) =

Swedish sailor (1950–2025)

Jan Roland Andersson (14 December 1950 – 7 October 2025), born in Uppsala, was a Swedish Olympic sailor. He finished 8th in the Soling class at 1980 Summer Olympics together with Bertil Larsson and Göran Andersson. He died on 7 October 2025, at the age of 74.
