= Bertil Larsson (sailor) =

Sweden sailor

Personal information
- Full name: Anders Bertil Larsson
- Nationality: Sweden
- Born: 8 March 1954 (age 72) Uppsala
- Height: 1.78 m (5.8 ft)

Sailing career
- Sport: Sailing
- Club: Ekolns SK
- Class: Soling
- Updated on 27 February 2020

Bertil Larsson (born 8 March 1954) is a sailor from Uppsala, Sweden, who represented his country at the 1980 Summer Olympics in Tallinn as crew member in the Soling. With helmsman Jan Andersson and fellow crew member Göran Andersson they took the 8th place.
