= Nikolay Polyakov =

Soviet sailor

Medal record

Sailing

Representing Soviet Union

Olympic Games
Silver medal – second place	1980 Moscow	Soling class

Nikolay Poljakov (born 14 June 1951) is an Estonian sailor of Russian descent who competed for Soviet Union. He won the silver medal in Soling in the 1980 Summer Olympics in Moscow along with Alexandr Budnikov and Boris Budnikov.
