= Aleksandr Budnikov =

Soviet sailor

Medal record

Sailing

Representing Soviet Union

Olympic Games
Silver medal – second place	1980 Moscow	Soling class

Alexandr Fyodorovich Budnikov (Russian: Александр Фёдорович Будников, born 10 May 1956) is a Soviet sailor. He won the silver medal in Mixed Three Person Keelboat in the 1980 Summer Olympics in Moscow along with Boris Budnikov and Nikolay Poliakov.
