= Anastasios Gavrilis =

Greek sailor

Medal record

Sailing

Representing Greece

Olympic Games
Bronze medal – third place	1980 Moscow	Soling class

Anastasios "Tasos" Gavrilis (Greek: Αναστάσιος Γαβριλης, born 21 December 1952) is a Greek Olympic medalist and competitor. He won a bronze medal in the Soling final at the 1980 Summer Olympics in Moscow, USSR.
